= List of Japanese Nobel laureates and nominees =

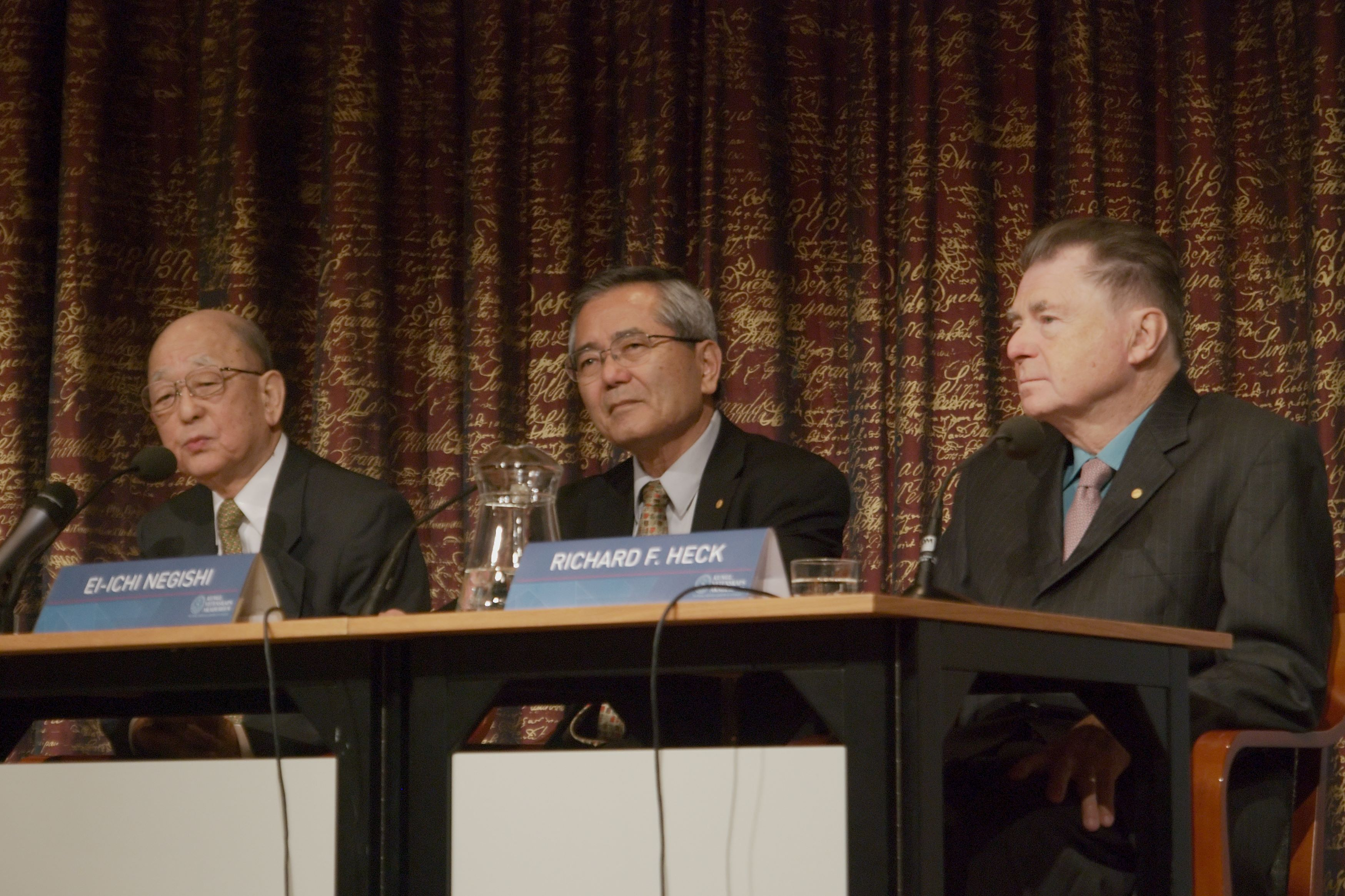
The Japanese Nobel Prize Laureate (2010) Akira Suzuki and Ei-ichi Negishi

Since 1949, there have been 34 Japanese laureates of the Nobel Prize. The Nobel Prize is a Sweden-based international monetary prize. The award was established by the 1895 will and estate of Swedish chemist and inventor Alfred Nobel. It was first awarded in Physics, Chemistry, Physiology or Medicine, Literature, and Peace in 1901. An associated prize, thus far, the Sveriges Riksbank Prize in Economic Sciences in Memory of Alfred Nobel, also sometimes known as the Nobel Prize in Economics, has yet to be awarded to a Japanese national.

The Nobel Prizes in the above specific sciences disciplines and the Prize in Economics, which is commonly identified with them, are widely regarded as the most prestigious award one can receive in those fields. Of Japanese winners, twelve have been physicists, ten chemists, three for literature, six for physiology or medicine, and two for efforts towards peace.

== Summary ==
Number of Nobel laureates by category
Category	Japanese citizens	Japanese organizations	Others born as Japanese citizens	Total	Others born in Japanese colonies	Remarks
Physics	9	-	3	12	-	Yoichiro Nambu, Shuji Nakamura, and Syukuro Manabe became American citizens.
Chemistry	10	-	-	10	2	Charles J. Pedersen has half Japanese ancestry (listed under the Diaspora), but Yuan T. Lee is not.
Physiology or Medicine	6	-	-	6	-	
Literature	2	-	1	3	-	Kazuo Ishiguro became a British citizen in 1983.
Peace	1	1	-	2	-	
Total	28	1	4	33	2	Japanese media usually count 32 laureates (excluding Kazuo Ishiguro).

== Laureates ==
Year	Portrait	Laureate (birth/death)	Field	Rational	Undergraduate alma mater
Citizens
1949		Hideki Yukawa (1907–1981)	Physics	"for his prediction of the existence of mesons on the basis of theoretical work on nuclear forces."	KyotoU
1965		Shin'ichirō Tomonaga (1906–1979)	Physics	"for their fundamental work in quantum electrodynamics, with deep-ploughing consequences for the physics of elementary particles." (jointly with American theoretical physicists Julian Schwinger and Richard Feynman)	KyotoU
1968		Yasunari Kawabata (1899–1972)	Literature	"for his narrative mastery, which with great sensibility expresses the essence of the Japanese mind."	UTokyo
1973		Leo Esaki (1925–)	Physics	"for their experimental discoveries regarding tunneling phenomena in semiconductors and superconductors, respectively." (jointly with Norwegian-American physicist Ivar Giaever and shared with Welsh theoretical physicist Brian David Josephson)	UTokyo
1974		Eisaku Satō (1901–1975)	Peace	"for his contribution to stabilize conditions in the Pacific rim area and for signing the Nuclear Non-Proliferation Treaty." (shared with Irish politician Seán MacBride)	UTokyo
1981		Kenichi Fukui (1918–1998)	Chemistry	"for their theories, developed independently, concerning the course of chemical reactions." (jointly with Polish-American theoretical chemist Roald Hoffmann)	KyotoU
1987		Susumu Tonegawa (1939–2026)	Physiology or Medicine	"for his discovery of the genetic principle for generation of antibody diversity."	KyotoU
1994		Kenzaburō Ōe (1935–2023)	Literature	"who with poetic force creates an imagined world, where life and myth condense to form a disconcerting picture of the human predicament today."	UTokyo
2000		Hideki Shirakawa (1936–2026)	Chemistry	"for their discovery and development of conductive polymers." (jointly with American chemist Alan MacDiarmid and physicist Alan J. Heeger)	Tokyo Tech
2001		Ryōji Noyori (1938–)	Chemistry	"for their work on chirally catalysed hydrogenation reactions." (jointly with American chemist William S. Knowles and shared with American chemist K. Barry Sharpless)	KyotoU
2002		Masatoshi Koshiba (1926–2020)	Physics	"for pioneering contributions to astrophysics, in particular for the detection of cosmic neutrinos." (jointly with American chemist Raymond Davis Jr. and shared with Italian-American Riccardo Giacconi)	UTokyo
2002		Koichi Tanaka (1959–)	Chemistry	"for the development of methods for identification and structure analyses of biological macromolecules... [and] for their development of soft desorption ionisation methods for mass spectrometric analyses of biological macromolecules." (jointly with American analytical chemist John B. Fenn and Swiss chemist Kurt Wüthrich)	Tohokudai
2008		Makoto Kobayashi (1944–)	Physics	"for the discovery of the origin of the broken symmetry which predicts the existence of at least three families of quarks in nature." (shared with Japanese-American physicist Yoichiro Nambu)	NagoyaU
2008		Toshihide Maskawa (1940–2021)	Physics	"for the discovery of the origin of the broken symmetry which predicts the existence of at least three families of quarks in nature." (shared with Japanese-American physicist Yoichiro Nambu)	NagoyaU
2008		Osamu Shimomura (1928–2018)	Chemistry	"for the discovery and development of the green fluorescent protein, GFP." (jointly with American neurobiologist Martin Chalfie and biochemist Roger Y. Tsien)	Nagasaki
2010		Ei-ichi Negishi (1935–2021)	Chemistry	"for palladium-catalyzed cross couplings in organic synthesis." (jointly with American chemist Richard F. Heck)	UTokyo
2010		Akira Suzuki (1930–)	Chemistry	"for palladium-catalyzed cross couplings in organic synthesis." (jointly with American chemist Richard F. Heck)	Hokudai
2012		Shinya Yamanaka (1962–)	Physiology or Medicine	"for the discovery that mature cells can be reprogrammed to become pluripotent." (jointly with British developmental biologist John B. Gurdon)	KobeU
2014		Isamu Akasaki (1929–2021)	Physics	"for the invention of efficient blue light-emitting diodes which has enabled bright and energy-saving white light sources." (jointly with Japanese-born American Shuji Nakamura)	KyotoU
2014		Hiroshi Amano (1960–)	Physics	"for the invention of efficient blue light-emitting diodes which has enabled bright and energy-saving white light sources." (jointly with Japanese-born American Shuji Nakamura)	NagoyaU
2015		Satoshi Ōmura (1935–)	Physiology or Medicine	"for their discoveries concerning a novel therapy against infections caused by roundworm parasites." (jointly with Irish-American parasitologist William C. Campbell and shared with Chinese pharmaceutical chemist Tu Youyou)	Nashidai
2015		Takaaki Kajita (1959–)	Physics	"for the discovery of neutrino oscillations, which shows that neutrinos have mass." (jointly with Canadian astrophysicist Arthur B. McDonald)	SaitamaU
2016		Yoshinori Ohsumi (1945–)	Physiology or Medicine	"for his discoveries of mechanisms for autophagy."	UTokyo
2018		Tasuku Honjo (1942–)	Physiology or Medicine	"for their discovery of cancer therapy by inhibition of negative immune regulation." (jointly with American immunologist James P. Allison)	KyotoU
2019		Akira Yoshino (1948–)	Chemistry	"for the development of lithium ion batteries." (jointly with American materials scientist John B. Goodenough and British-American chemist M. Stanley Whittingham)	KyotoU
2024		Nihon Hidankyo	Peace	"for its efforts to achieve a world free of nuclear weapons and for demonstrating through witness testimony that nuclear weapons must never be used again."	N/A
2025		Shimon Sakaguchi (1951–)	Physiology or Medicine	"for their discoveries concerning peripheral immune tolerance." (jointly with American immunologists Mary E. Brunkow and Fred Ramsdell)	KyotoU
2025		Susumu Kitagawa (1951–)	Chemistry	"for the development of metal-organic frameworkse." (jointly with American materials scientist Richard Robson and Omar M. Yaghi)	KyotoU
2026		Kensō Soai (1950–)	Chemistry	“for the discovery of non-linear effects and autocatalysis in asymmetric organic synthesis” (jointly with French chemist Henri Kagan)	UTokyo
Diaspora (Note: Nobel laureates of Japanese birth and origin but subsequently acquired foreign citizenship. Excluding Yuan T. Lee, who was born in Japanese Taiwan, has no Japanese ancestry, and did not have Japanese nationality when he won the Nobel Prize in 1986.)
1987		Charles J. Pedersen (Note: The 1987 Nobel Prize in Chemistry winner Charles J. Pedersen has a Japanese mother and his Japanese first name was Yoshio (良男). Born in Busan, Korea, Japanese protectorate, he moved to Japan with his family at the age of 8 years to attend a convent school in Nagasaki. When he was 10 years old, he moved to Yokohama and entered an international school, called Saint Joseph College in Yamate, Naka-ku.) (1904–1989)	Chemistry	"for their development and use of molecules with structure-specific interactions of high selectivity." (jointly with American chemist Donald J. Cram and French chemist Jean-Marie Lehn)	UDayton
2008		Yoichiro Nambu (1921–2015)	Physics	"for the discovery of the mechanism of spontaneous broken symmetry in subatomic physics." (jointly with Japanese physicists Toshihide Maskawa and Makoto Kobayashi)	UTokyo
2014		Shuji Nakamura (1954–)	Physics	"for the invention of efficient blue light-emitting diodes which has enabled bright and energy-saving white light sources." (jointly with Japanese physicists Isamu Akasaki and Hiroshi Amano)	TokushimaU
2017		Kazuo Ishiguro (1954–)	Literature	"who, in novels of great emotional force, has uncovered the abyss beneath our illusory sense of connection with the world."	Kent
2021		Syukuro Manabe (1931–)	Physics	"for the physical modelling of Earth's climate, quantifying variability and reliably predicting global warming." (jointly with German climate modeller Klaus Hasselmann and shared with Italian theoretical physicist Giorgio Parisi)	UTokyo

=== List by alma mater ===
As of 2025, the list of Nobel Prize winners of Japanese nationality and Japanese ancestry by undergraduate alma mater.

Logo	Institution	Country	Number of laureates
	Kyoto University	Japan	10 (1949, 1965, 1981, 1987, 2001, 2014, 2018, 2019, 2025); Hideki Yukawa, Sin-Itiro Tomonaga, Kenichi Fukui, Susumu Tonegawa, Ryōji Noyori, Isamu Akasaki, Tasuku Honjo, Akira Yoshino, Shimon Sakaguchi, Susumu Kitagawa
	The University of Tokyo	Japan	10 (1968, 1973, 1974, 1994, 2002, 2008, 2010, 2016, 2021, 2026); Yasunari Kawabata, Leo Esaki, Eisaku Satō, Kenzaburō Ōe, Masatoshi Koshiba, Yoichiro Nambu, Ei-ichi Negishi, Yoshinori Ohsumi, Syukuro Manabe, Kensō Soai
	Nagoya University	Japan	3 (2008, 2014); Makoto Kobayashi, Toshihide Maskawa, Hiroshi Amano
	Hokkaido University	Japan	1 (2010); Akira Suzuki
	Kobe University	Japan	1 (2012); Shinya Yamanaka
	Nagasaki University	Japan	1 (2008); Osamu Shimomura
	Saitama University	Japan	1 (2015); Takaaki Kajita
	Tohoku University	Japan	1 (2002); Koichi Tanaka
	Tokyo Institute of Technology	Japan	1 (2000); Hideki Shirakawa
	Tokushima University	Japan	1 (2014); Shuji Nakamura
	University of Dayton	United States	1 (1987); Charles J. Pedersen
	University of Kent	United Kingdom	1 (2017); Kazuo Ishiguro
	University of Yamanashi	Japan	1 (2015); Satoshi Omura

Number of People by Degree Granting Institutions
By degree (bachelor, master, doctorate) awarded, the number of Japanese alumni awarded by each university is as follows (including those with Japanese nationality and those of Japanese origin; as of October 9, 2019):

- Kyoto University 12
- The University of Tokyo 11
- Nagoya University 5
- Osaka University 2

Only one Japanese degree holder from the following universities has won the Nobel Prize: Hokkaido University, Kobe University, Nagasaki University, Osaka City University, Saitama University, Tohoku University, Tokushima University, Tokyo Institute of Technology, Tokyo University of Science, University of East Anglia, University of California, San Diego, University of Kent, University of Pennsylvania, University of Rochester, University of Yamanashi

== Nominees ==
Picture	Name (Note: The (*) asterisks on the name denote the nominees were expatriates who resided or died in Japan.)	Born	Died	Years Nominated	Notes
Physiology or Medicine
	Kitasato Shibasaburō	29 January 1853; Oguni, Kumamoto, Japan	13 June 1931; Tokyo, Japan	1901	Nominated by Árpád Bókay (1856–1919).
	Oscar Loew*	2 April 1844; Marktredwitz, Bavaria, Germany	26 January 1941; Berlin, Germany	1912	Nominated by Rudolph Emmerich (1856–1914).
	Sahachirō Hata	23 March 1873; Masuda, Shimane, Japan	22 November 1938; Tokyo, Japan	1912	Nominated for the Nobel Prize in Chemistry too.
	Hideyo Noguchi	17 April 1866; Inawashiro, Fukushima, Japan	2 May 1927; Accra, Ghana	1913, 1914, 1915, 1920, 1921, 1924, 1925, 1926, 1927, 1928	
	Umetaro Suzuki	7 April 1874; Makinohara, Shizuoka, Japan	20 September 1943; Tokyo, Japan	1914	Nominated by Wolfgang Heubner (1877–1957) and nominated for the Nobel Prize in Chemistry.
	Yutaka Ido	1881; Okayama, Japan	1919; Tokyo, Japan	1919	Nominated jointly with Jules Bordet (1870–1961) and Ryukichi Inada (1874–1950) by Louis Martin (1864–1946).
	Ryukichi Inada	18 March 1874; Nagoya, Aichi, Japan	27 February 1950; Tokyo, Japan	1919, 1923	
	Yamagiwa Katsusaburō	23 February 1863; Ueda, Nagano, Japan	2 March 1930; Tokyo, Japan	1924, 1925, 1926, 1927, 1928, 1930, 1936	
	Gen'ichi Katō	11 February 1890; Niimi, Okayama, Japan	1 May 1979; Niimi, Okayama, Japan	1928, 1935, 1937, 1944	
	Otto Schöbl*	27 August 1877; Zditz, Beroun, Czechia	13 October 1938; Tokyo, Japan	1929	
	Kure Ken	27 October 1883; Tokyo, Japan	27 June 1940; Tokyo, Japan	1931, 1933, 1935, 1936, 1937, 1939	
	Takaoki Sasaki	5 May 1878; Tokyo, Japan	31 October 1966; Tokyo, Japan	1935, 1936, 1939, 1941	
	Koichi Ichikawa	6 April 1888; Sakuragawa, Ibaraki, Japan	4 September 1948; Japan	1936	Nominated jointly with Takaoki Sasaki (1878–1966) and Yamagiwa Katsusaburō (1863–1930) by Ren Kimura (1896–1982).
	Kuno Yasu	30 March 1882; Nagoya, Aichi, Japan	30 December 1977; Japan	1936, 1938, 1953	
	Bun'ichi Hasama	1898; Ōita, Japan	January, 1946; Fukuoka, Japan	1938	Nominated jointly with Alexander Gurwitsch (1874–1954) and Alexander Ludwig von Muralt (1903–1990) by Albrecht Bethe (1872–1954).
	Makoto Ishihara	18 May 1879; Itami, Hyōgo, Japan	11 December 1938; Japan	1939	Nominated posthumously by Daize Ogata (?).
	Riuso Torikata (Ryūzō Torigata)	August 20, 1877 Hakodate, Japan	February 19, 1952 Osaka, Japan	1939	
	Ichiji Tasaki	10 October 1910; Fukushima, Japan	4 January 2009; Bethesda, Maryland, United States	1944	Nominated jointly with Gen'ichi Katō (1890–1979) by Alexander Ludwig von Muralt (1903–1990).
	Toshiyuki Kurotsu	12 November 1898; Kyoto, Japan	16 November 1992; Japan	1952	Nominated by Naosaburo Yoshii (1910–1997).
	Katsunuma Seizō	28 August 1886; Shizuoka, Japan	9 November 1963; Nagoya, Aichi, Japan	1953	Nominated by Naka Kikkawa (1888–?).
	Furuhata Tanemoto	15 June 1891; Mie Prefecture, Japan	6 May 1975; Tokyo, Japan	1954, 1956	
	Kōichi Motokawa	17 January 1903; Ishikawa, Japan	3 February 1971; Sendai, Miyagi, Japan	1955	
	Tomizo Yoshida	10 February 1903; Asakawa, Fukushima, Japan	27 April 1973; Tokyo, Japan	1955,1956	
	Ogata Tomosaburō	31 January 1883; Tokyo, Japan	25 August 1973; Japan	1956	Nominated by A. Kimara (?).
Physics
	Kristian Birkeland*	13 December 1867; Oslo, Norway	15 June 1917; Tokyo, Japan	1915, 1916, 1917	Nominated jointly with Carl Størmer (1874–1957) each time and nominated for the Nobel Prize in Chemistry too.
	Kotaro Honda	23 February 1870; Okazaki, Aichi, Japan	12 February 1954; Tokyo, Japan	1932	
	Hideki Yukawa	23 January 1907; Tokyo, Japan	8 September 1981; Kyoto, Japan	1940, 1941, 1943, 1944, 1945, 1946, 1948, 1949, 1950	Awarded the 1949 Nobel Prize in Physics and nominated for Nobel Peace Prize too
	Shin'ichirō Tomonaga	31 March 1906; Tokyo, Japan	8 July 1979; Tokyo, Japan	1951, 1952, 1955, 1956, 1957, 1960, 1962, 1963, 1964, 1965	Shared the 1965 Nobel Prize in Physics with Richard Feynman and Julian Schwinger.
	Kazuhiko Nishijima	4 October 1926; Tsuchiura, Ibaraki, Japan	15 February 2009; Tokyo, Japan	1960, 1961, 1964, 1966, 1967, 1968, 1969, 1970	
	Tadao Nakano	1926; Tokyo, Japan	15 August 2004; Takatsuki, Osaka, Japan	1961, 1970	Nominated jointly with Kazuhiko Nishijima (1926–2009) each time.
	Susumu Okubo	2 March 1930; Tokyo, Japan	17 July 2015; Rochester, New York, United States	1965	Nominated by Robert Marshak (1916–1992).
	Yoshio Ōnuki	7 November 1928; Tochigi, Japan	(aged 98)	1965, 1966 (Note: "Nominations 18847&19324 to Yoshio Ohnuki have been hidden at the Nomination Archive site according to § 8 of the statutes governing the Nobel archives of the Royal Swedish Academy of Sciences")	Nominated jointly with Murray Gell-Mann (1929–2013) and Yuval Ne'eman (1925–2006) by Gordon Sutherland (1907–1980). (Note: "Data of Y Ohnuki (id 13855) have been hidden at the Nomination Archive site according to § 8 of the statutes governing the Nobel archives of the Royal Swedish Academy of Sciences")
	Shuji Fukui	19 August 1923; Osaka, Japan	4 May 2018; Japan	1966	Nominated jointly with Jack Warren Keuffel (1919–1974), Thomas Edwin Cranshaw (1922–2016) and Johannes Frederik de Beer (1933–2021) by Yozo Nogami (1918–2008).
	Sigenori Miyamoto	20 October 1931; Akashi, Hyōgo, Japan	31 December 2017; Japan	1966	Nominated jointly with Jack Warren Keuffel (1919–1974), Thomas Edwin Cranshaw (1922–2016) and Johannes Frederik de Beer (1933–2021) by Yozo Nogami (1918–2008).
	Leo Esaki	12 March 1925; Higashiōsaka, Osaka, Japan	(aged 101)	1968, (Note: "Nomination 20252 and following ones have been hidden at the Nomination Archive site according to § 8 of the statutes governing the Nobel archives of the Royal Swedish Academy of Sciences") 1971, 1972, 1973	Shared the 1973 Nobel Prize in Physics with Ivar Giaever and Brian Josephson. (Note: "Data of Leo Esaki (id 14575) have been hidden at the Nomination Archive site according to § 8 of the statutes governing the Nobel archives of the Royal Swedish Academy of Sciences")
	Hiroomi Umezawa	20 September 1924; Kurihashi, Saitama, Japan	24 March 1995; Edmonton, Alberta, Canada	1968	Nominated by Eduardo Renato Caianiello (1921–1993) and nominated for the Nobel Prize in Chemistry too.
	Jun Kondō	6 February 1930; Tokyo, Japan	11 March 2022; Suginami, Japan	1969, 1972, 1974	
	Shoichi Sakata	18 January 1911; Tokyo, Japan	16 October 1970; Nagoya, Japan	1970	Nominated jointly with Tadao Nakano (1926–2004) and Kazuhiko Nishijima (1926–2009) by Hideki Yukawa (1907–1981).
	Ryogo Kubo	15 February 1920; Tokyo, Japan	31 March 1995; Japan	1970, 1973, 1974, 1975	Nominated for the Nobel Prize in Chemistry too.
	Yoichiro Nambu	18 January 1921; Tokyo, Japan	5 July 2015; Toyonaka, Osaka, Japan	1971, 1975	Shared the 2008 Nobel Prize in Physics with Makoto Kobayashi and Toshihide Maskawa
	Chushiro Hayashi	25 July 1920; Kyoto, Japan	28 February 2010; Kyoto, Japan	1972	Nominated by Hiroshi Maeda (1938–2021).
Chemistry
	Kristian Birkeland*	13 December 1867; Oslo, Norway	15 June 1917; Tokyo, Japan	1907, 1909, 1912, 1913	Nominated for the Nobel Prize in Physics too.
	Sahachirō Hata	23 March 1873; Masuda, Shimane, Japan	22 November 1938; Tokyo, Japan	1911	Nominated jointly with Paul Ehrlich (1854–1915) by Emil Theodor Kocher (1841–1917) and nominated for the Nobel Prize in Physiology or Medicine too.
	Umetaro Suzuki	7 April 1874; Makinohara, Shizuoka, Japan	20 September 1943; Tokyo, Japan	1927, (Note: Nominations were declared invalid by the Nobel Committee - The Nobel Population 1901-1937: A Census of the Nominators and Nominees for the Prizes in Physics and Chemistry Elisabeth T. Crawford, J. L. Heilbron, Rebecca Ullrich (Office for History of Science and Technology, University of California, 1987)) 1936	Nominated for the Nobel Prize in Physiology or Medicine too.
	Yasuhiko Asahina	16 April 1881; Tokyo, Japan	30 June 1975; Tokyo, Japan	1951, 1952	
	Yoshiyuki Toyama	6 September 1896; Tokyo, Japan	12 February 1980; Tokyo, Japan	1958	
	Gerhard Schramm*	27 June 1910; Yokohama, Kanagawa, Japan	3 February 1969; Tübingen, Baden-Württemberg, Germany	1960, 1963, 1964, 1965, 1966, 1967, 1968	
	San'ichirō Mizushima	21 March 1899; Tokyo, Japan	3 August 1983; Tokyo, Japan	1962, 1964, 1967, 1968, 1970, 1971	
	Eiji Ochiai	26 June 1898; Urawa, Saitama, Japan	4 November 1974; Japan	1968	Nominated by Shuzo Shibata (1924–).
	Yusuke Sumiki	10 February 1901; Niigata, Japan	11 September 1974; Tokyo, Japan	1968	Nominated jointly with Brian Edward Cross (1923–) by Kozo Hirota (?).
	Teijirō Yabuta	16 December 1888; Ōtsu, Shiga, Japan	20 July 1977; Tokyo, Japan	1968	Nominated jointly with Brian Edward Cross (1923–) by Kozo Hirota (?).
	Tetsuo Nozoe	16 May 1902; Sendai, Miyagi, Japan	4 April 1996; Tokyo, Japan	1970, 1971, 1972, 1973, 1974	
	Setsuro Ebashi	31 August 1922; Tokyo, Japan	17 July 2006; Okazaki, Aichi, Japan	1971	Nominated by Mohamad Khalil Salah (?).
	Osamu Hayaishi	8 January 1920; Stockton, California, United States	17 December 2015; Kyoto, Japan	1972, 1973, 1974	
	Kenzi Tamaru	2 November 1923; Kamakura, Kanagawa, Japan	22 July 2020; United States	1973	
	Hiroomi Umezawa	20 September 1924; Kurihashi, Saitama, Japan	24 March 1995; Edmonton, Alberta, Canada	1973	Nominated for the Nobel Prize in Physics too.
	Ryogo Kubo	15 February 1920; Tokyo, Japan	31 March 1995; Japan	1974	Nominated jointly with Nikolay Bogolyubov (1909–1992) and Ilya Prigogine (1917–2003) by Nikolay Emanuel (1915-1984) and nominated for the Nobel Prize in Physics too.
	Koichi Shimoda	5 October 1920; Urawa, Saitama, Japan	29 May 2023; Tokyo, Japan	1975	
Literature
	Toyohiko Kagawa	10 July 1888; Kobe, Hyōgo, Japan	23 April 1960; Tokyo, Japan	1947, 1948	Nominated for Nobel Peace Prize too.
	Jun'ichirō Tanizaki	24 July 1886; Nihonbashi, Tokyo, Japan	30 July 1965; Yugawara, Kanagawa, Japan	1958, 1960, 1961, 1962, 1963, 1964, 1965	
	Junzaburō Nishiwaki	20 January 1894; Ojiya, Niigata, Japan	5 June 1982; Ojiya, Niigata, Japan	1958, 1960, 1961, 1962, 1963, 1964, 1965, 1966, 1967, 1968	
	Yasunari Kawabata	14 June 1899; Osaka, Japan	16 April 1972; Kanagawa, Japan	1961, 1962, 1963, 1964, 1965, 1966, 1967, 1968	Awarded the 1968 Nobel Prize in Literature.
	Yukio Mishima	14 January 1925; Tokyo, Japan	25 November 1970; Tokyo, Japan	1963, 1964, 1965, 1967, 1968	
	Yasushi Inoue	6 May 1907; Asahikawa, Kamikawa, Japan	29 January 1991; Tokyo, Japan	1969	Nominated by Erich Ruprecht (1906–1997).
	Sei Itō	16 January 1905; Otaru, Japan	15 November 1969; Tokyo, Japan	1970	Nominated jointly (Itō – posthumously) by Serizawa Kōjirō (1897–1993).
	Tatsuzō Ishikawa	2 July 1905; Yokote, Akita, Japan	31 January 1985; Tokyo, Japan	1970	Nominated jointly (Itō – posthumously) by Serizawa Kōjirō (1897–1993).
	Kenzaburō Ōe	31 January 1935; Uchiko, Ehime, Japan	3 March 2023; Tokyo, Japan	1974, 1975	Awarded the 1994 Nobel Prize in Literature.
	Masuji Ibuse	15 February 1898; Fukuyama, Hiroshima, Japan	20 July 1993; Suginami, Tokyo, Japan	1975	Nominated by Michel Cadot (1926–2022).
	Kōbō Abe	7 March 1924; Kita, Tokyo, Japan	22 January 1993; Tokyo, Japan	1984, 1987, 1991, 1992, 1993	
	Shūsaku Endō	27 March 1923; Toshima, Tokyo, Japan	29 September 1996; Tokyo, Japan	1994	
Peace
	Nagao Ariga	13 November 1860; Osaka, Japan	17 May 1921; Tokyo, Japan	1909	Nominated by Carl Hilty (1833–1909).
	Shibusawa Eiichi	16 March 1840; Fukaya, Saitama, Japan	11 November 1931; Tokyo, Japan	1926, 1927	
	Richard von Coudenhove-Kalergi	16 November 1894; Tokyo, Japan	27 July 1972; Schruns, Vorarlberg, Austria	1931, 1932, 1933, 1934, 1935, 1937, 1938, 1940, 1941, 1946, 1948, 1949, 1950, 1951, 1952, 1956, 1958, 1961, 1963, 1965, 1967, 1968, 1971, 1972	
	Toyohiko Kagawa	10 July 1888; Kobe, Hyōgo, Japan	23 April 1960; Tokyo, Japan	1947, 1948	Nominated for Nobel Prize in Literature too.
	Nobusuke Kishi	13 November 1896; Tabuse, Yamaguchi, Japan	7 August 1987; Tokyo, Japan	1960	Nominated by Spessard Holland (1892–1971). Prime Minister of Japan (1957–1960)
	Daisetsu Teitaro Suzuki	18 October 1870; Kanazawa, Ishikawa, Japan	12 July 1966; Kamakura, Kanagawa, Japan	1963	Nominated by Hideo Kishimoti (1903–1964).
	Shigeru Yoshida	22 September 1878; Surugadai, Tokyo, Japan	20 October 1967; Oiso, Kanagawa, Japan	1965, 1966, 1967	Prime Minister of Japan (1948–1954)
	Hideki Yukawa	23 January 1907; Tokyo, Japan	8 September 1981; Kyoto, Japan	1966	Awarded the 1949 Nobel Prize in Physics.
	Yoshio Koya	1890; Japan	1974; Japan	1968	Nominated by Martin Allwood (1916–1999).
	Kaoru Hatoyama	21 November 1888; Yokohama, Kanagawa, Japan	15 August 1982; Tokyo, Japan	1969	
	Eisaku Satō	27 March 1901; Tabuse, Yamaguchi, Japan	3 June 1975; Minato, Tokyo, Japan	1974	Shared the 1974 Nobel Peace Prize with Seán MacBride. Prime Minister of Japan (1964–1972)
	Tsūsai Sugawara	16 February 1894; Kashiwa, Chiba, Japan	13 June 1981; Japan	1976	Nominated by Masayuki Fujio (1917–2006).
	Nihon Hidankyō	August 1956; Shibadaimon, Minato, Tokyo, Japan		1985, 1994, 2005, 2017, 2018, 2024	Awarded the 2024 Nobel Peace Prize.
	Hibakusha of Japan	1945; Hiroshima and Nagasaki, Japan		2015, 2022	Awarded the 2024 Nobel Peace Prize.
	Moon Ik-hwan*	2 June 1918; Longjing, Jilin, China	18 January 1994; Fukuoka, Japan	1992	Nominated by the American Friends Service Committee.
	Shinichi Suzuki	17 October 1898; Nagoya, Aichi, Japan	26 January 1998; Matsumoto, Nagano, Japan	1993	
	Iri Maruki	20 June 1901; Asakita-ku, Hiroshima, Japan	19 October 1995; Higashimatsuyama, Saitama, Japan	1995	Nominated jointly by Lawrence Wittner (1941–).
	Toshi Akamatsu-Maruki	11 February 1912; Chippubetsu, Hokkaido, Japan	13 January 2000; Moroyama, Saitama, Japan	1995	Nominated jointly by Lawrence Wittner (1941–).
	Shozo Shimamoto	22 January 1928; Osaka, Japan	25 January 2013; Osaka, Japan	1996	Nominated by Bern Porter (1911–2004).
	Saburō Ienaga	3 September 1913; Nagoya, Aichi, Japan	29 November 2002; Tokyo, Japan	1999, 2001	
	Katsuko Nomura	26 November 1910; Kyoto, Japan	21 August 2010; Japan	2005	Nominated jointly by Ruth-Gaby Vermot-Mangold (1941–) as part of the 1000 PeaceWomen Across the Globe.
	Kumiko Yokoi	1944; Nagoya, Aichi, Japan	14 January 2021; Kunitachi, Tokyo, Japan	2005	Nominated jointly by Ruth-Gaby Vermot-Mangold (1941–) as part of the 1000 PeaceWomen Across the Globe.
	Song Sin-do*	24 November 1922; Chūseinan, South Korea	16 December 2017; Tokyo, Japan	2005	Nominated jointly by Ruth-Gaby Vermot-Mangold (1941–) as part of the 1000 PeaceWomen Across the Globe.
	Suzuyo Takazato	1940; Taiwan	(aged 86)	2005	Nominated jointly by Ruth-Gaby Vermot-Mangold (1941–) as part of the 1000 PeaceWomen Across the Globe.
	Yuki Ando	Japan	—N/a	2005	Nominated jointly by Ruth-Gaby Vermot-Mangold (1941–) as part of the 1000 PeaceWomen Across the Globe.
	Yukika Sohma	26 January 1912; Tokyo, Japan	8 November 2008; Karuizawa, Nagano, Japan	2005	Nominated jointly by Ruth-Gaby Vermot-Mangold (1941–) as part of the 1000 PeaceWomen Across the Globe.
	Yuri Kochiyama	19 May 1921; San Pedro, Los Angeles, California, United States	1 June 2014; Berkeley, California, United States	2005	Nominated jointly by Ruth-Gaby Vermot-Mangold (1941–) as part of the 1000 PeaceWomen Across the Globe.
	Yoshioka Tatsuya	1960; Osaka, Japan	(aged 66)	2008	
	Peace Boat	September 1983; Tokyo, Japan		2008	
	Mayors for Peace	June 1982; Hiroshima, Japan		2008, 2011	
	Article 9 Association	2004; Tokyo, Japan		2014, 2015, 2021	
	Setsuko Thurlow	3 January 1932; Hiroshima, Japan	(aged 94)	2015	
	Masahide Ōta	12 June 1925; Kumejima, Okinawa, Japan	12 June 2017; Naha, Okinawa, Japan	2017	
	Onodera Toshitaka	1941; Japan	(aged 85)	2017	
	Hiroshima and Nagasaki Peace Messengers	1998; Nyon, Vaud, Switzerland		2019	

=== Notes ===
Physics
Shoichi Sakata reported the "Sakata model" - a model of hadrons in 1956, that inspired Murray Gell-Mann and George Zweig's quark model. Moreover, Kazuhiko Nishijima and Tadao Nakano originally given the Gell-Mann–Nishijima formula in 1953. However, 1969 physics prize was only awarded to Murray Gell-Mann. Afterward, Ivar Waller, the member of Nobel Committee for Physics was sorry that Sakata had not received a physics prize.

Yoji Totsuka was leading the experiment that the first definitive evidence for neutrino oscillations was measured, via a high-statistics, high-precision measurement of the atmospheric neutrino flux. His Super-K group also confirmed, along with the Sudbury Neutrino Observatory (SNO), the solution to the solar neutrino problem. The Nobel Prize winning physicist Masatoshi Koshiba was told that if Totsuka could extend his lifespan by eighteen months, he would receive the physics prize.

Chemistry
Eiji Osawa prediction of the C_{60} molecule at Hokkaido University in 1970. He noticed that the structure of a corannulene molecule was a subset of an Association football shape, and he hypothesised that a full ball shape could also exist. Japanese scientific journals reported his idea, but it did not reach Europe or the Americas. Because of this, he was not awarded the 1996 chemistry prize.

Seiji Shinkai invented the first molecular machine in 1979, but he was not awarded the 2016 chemistry prize. On the contrary, Ben Feringa, one of the 2016 Nobel laureates, made a special trip to Japan in the 1980s to ask Shinkai for advice in the research.

Physiology or Medicine
Kitasato Shibasaburō and Emil von Behring working together in Berlin in 1890 announced the discovery of diphtheria antitoxin serum; Von Behring was awarded the 1901 prize because of this work, but Kitasato was not. Meanwhile, Hideyo Noguchi and Sahachiro Hata, those who missed out on the early Nobel Prize for many times.

Katsusaburō Yamagiwa and his student Kōichi Ichikawa successfully induced squamous cell carcinoma by painting crude coal tar on the inner surface of rabbits' ears. Yamagiwa's work has become the primary basis for research of cause of cancer. However, Johannes Fibiger was awarded the 1926 medicine prize because of his incorrect Spiroptera carcinoma theory, while the Yamagiwa group was snubbed by Nobel Committee. In 1966, the former committee member Folke Henschen claimed "I was strongly advocate Dr. Yamagiwa deserve the Nobel Prize, but unfortunate it did not realize". In 2010, the Encyclopædia Britannica 's guide to Nobel Prizes in cancer research mentions Yamagiwa's work as a milestone without mentioning Fibiger.

Umetaro Suzuki completed the first vitamin complex was isolated in 1910. When the article was translated into German, the translation failed to state that it was a newly discovered nutrient, a claim made in the original Japanese article, and hence his discovery failed to gain publicity. Because of this, he was not awarded the 1929 medicine prize.

Satoshi Mizutani and Howard Martin Temin jointly discovered that the Rous sarcoma virus particle contained the enzyme reverse transcriptase, and Mizutani was solely responsible for the original conception and design of the novel experiment that confirmed Temin's provirus hypothesis. However, Mizutani was not awarded the 1975 medicine prize along with Temin.

As of 2015, there have been seven Japanese who have received the Lasker Award and twelve Japanese who have received the Canada Gairdner International Award, but only three Japanese who have received the Nobel Prize in Physiology or Medicine.

Others
A number of important Japanese native scientists were not nominated for early Nobel Prizes, such as Yasuhiko Kojima and Yasuichi Nagano (jointly discovered Interferon), Jōkichi Takamine (first isolated epinephrine), Kiyoshi Shiga (discovered Shigella dysenteriae), Tomisaku Kawasaki (Kawasaki disease is named after him), and Hakaru Hashimoto. After World War II, Reiji Okazaki and his wife Tsuneko were known for describing the role of Okazaki fragments, but he died of leukemia (sequelae of the atomic bombing of Hiroshima) in 1975 at the age of 44.

Masahiko Aoki, seen as the most likely candidate to become the first Japanese to win the Nobel Prize for economics, for developing the Institutional Comparative Analysis, he taught at Kyoto University and Stanford University. He died in Palo Alto, California, in July, 2015. He was 77.

== See also ==
- List of Japanese people
- List of Nobel laureates
- List of Asian Nobel laureates
- List of Nobel laureates affiliated with the University of Tokyo
- List of Nobel laureates affiliated with Kyoto University
- List of Nobel laureates by country
