= Yoshinori Tokura =

Japanese physicist (born 1954)

Yoshinori Tokura ForMemRS
- 十倉 好紀
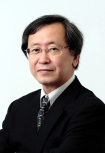
- Yoshinori Tokura
- Born: March 1, 1954 (age 72); Nishiwaki, Hyōgo
- Citizenship: Japan
- Education: The University of Tokyo
- Known for: Tokura Rule
- Awards: Nishina Memorial Prize (1990); James C. McGroddy Prize for New Materials (2005); Imperial Prize of the Japan Academy (2013)
- Scientific career
- Fields: Physics
- Workplaces: The University of Tokyo; RIKEN

Yoshinori Tokura (十倉 好紀, Tokura Yoshinori; born March 1, 1954) ForMemRS is a Japanese physicist, Professor at University of Tokyo and Director of Center for Emergent Matter Science (CEMS) at RIKEN. He is a specialist in physics of strongly correlated electron systems and known for his work in high-temperature superconductivity, Mott transition, colossal magnetoresistance, Multiferroics, and magnetic skyrmions.

== Biography ==
Tokura was born in Nishiwaki, Hyōgo, Japan. He holds a: B.S. in Applied Physics, the University of Tokyo (1976), and a M.S. (1978) and Ph.D (1981) in that subject from the same university. His subsequent career has also been at the University of Tokyo, rising from Research Associate to Lecturer in the Dept. of Applied Physics, then Assistant Professor and Professor in the Dept. of Physics, and finally, from 1995 on, Professor in Dept. of Applied Physics.

In addition has been

- 1993 – 2002: Group Leader, Joint Research Center for Atom Technology (JRCAT)
- 2001 – 2008: Director, Correlated Electron Research Center (CERC), AIST
- 2001 – 2007: Research Director, Tokura Spin Superstructure, ERATO-JST
- 2006 – 2012: Research Director, Tokura Multiferroics Project, ERATO-JST
- 2007 – 2013: Group Director, Cross-Correlated Materials Research Group (CMRG), RIKEN
- 2008–present: AIST Fellow, National Institute of Advanced Industrial Science and Technology (AIST)
- 2010 – 2013: Center Director, Quantum-Phase Electronics Center (QPEC), School of Engineering, The University of Tokyo
- 2010 – 2013: Director, Emergent Materials Department, RIKEN Advanced Science Institute
- 2010 – 2013: Group Director, Correlated Electron Research Group (CERG), RIKEN Advanced Science Institute
- 2013–Present: Director of Center for Emergent Matter Science (CEMS)

== Academy ==
He is a Member of the Science Council of Japan, and a Foreign Member of the Royal Swedish Academy of Sciences (2014 – )

== Recognition ==
- 1990: Nishina Memorial Prize
- 1990: IBM Japan Science Prize
- 1991: Bernd T. Matthias Prize
- 1998: Nissan Science Prize
- 1999: JPS Award for Academic Papers on Physics
- 2002: Asahi Prize
- 2002: ISI Citation Laureate Award （Department of Applied Physics）
- 2003: Medal with Purple Ribbon
- 2005: James C. McGroddy Prize for New Materials
- 2011: 52nd Fujihara Award
- 2012: IUPAP Magnetism Award and Néel Medal
- 2013: Imperial Prize of the Japan Academy
- 2014: Honorary Doctor at Uppsala University
- 2014: 55th Honda Memorial Award
- 2014: Thomson Reuters Citation Laureates
- 2020: Person of Cultural Merit
- 2022: Members of the Japan Academy
- 2023: Foreign Member of the Royal Society
- 2023: Leo Esaki Award
