= Seigo Tarucha =

Japanese physicist (born 1953)

- Born: 1953 (age 72–73); Ehime Prefecture
- Education: University of Tokyo
- Awards: Leo Esaki Prize
- Scientific career
- Workplaces: NTT Basic Research Laboratories, University of Tokyo, RIKEN
- Thesis: Research on the optical properties of Al-Ga-As quantum well structures and their device applications (1986)
- Website: cems.riken.jp/en/laboratory/qfsrg

Seigo Tarucha (born 1953) is a Japanese experimental physicist who is known for his research on gate-defined semiconductor quantum dots and spin qubits.

== Biography ==
Tarucha was born 1953 in Ehime Prefecture. He studied Applied Physics at the University of Tokyo, where he obtained his BS in 1976, his MSc in 1978, and his PhD in 1986. In 1978 he joined NTT Basic Research Laboratories as Staff Member, becoming Senior Researcher (1985), Principal Researcher (1989), Group Leader (1990), and Distinguished Scientist (1994–1998) there. In 1998 he was appointed professor at the Department of Physics at the University of Tokyo and from 2004 to 2018 he was professor in the Department of Applied Physics at the same university. In 2013, he joined RIKEN, where he was named Division Director of the Quantum Information Electronics Division and Group Director of the Quantum Functional System Research Group, both at the RIKEN Center for Emergent Matter Science. Since 2018 he is also Deputy Director of this center and he also heads the Semiconductor Quantum Information Device Research Team (since 2020) and the Emergent Phenomena Observation Technology Research Team (since 2024).

In his research, Tarucha has studied the quantum physics of GaAs and silicon nanostructures, in particular the transport through quantum dots and quantum dot molecules (including investigations of the Kondo effect with quantum dots) and their spin physics. His research contributed to establishing the basic control and measurement operations for these systems (controlled charging of the dots, single-shot spin measurement, microwave spectroscopy, coherent control using ESR and time-dependent gate voltages to modify the exchange coupling between neighboring quantum dots) and demonstrating the quantum dots atom- and molecule-like properties. Much of his work since the late 1990s addressed the potential use of electron spins in quantum dots as qubits for quantum information processing following the Loss-DiVincenzo proposal. Work in his group demonstrated among others electrically-driven single- and two-qubit quantum gates. More recently, his group demonstrated a quantum-dot spin qubit with a fidelity above 99.9% in 2018 and quantum error correction using a three-qubit code.

According to Web of Science he has (as of 2024) co-authored over 500 research articles in peer-reviewed journals which were cited more than 24,000 times (h-index of 66). Among others, he is co-author of several highly cited review articles on the physics of few-electron gate-defined quantum dots.

== Awards ==
- 2000 Ryogo Kubo Award
- 2002 Nishina Memorial Prize
- 2005 National Medal with Purple Ribbon
- 2007 Leo Esaki Prize
- 2017 Outstanding Achievement Award of the Japan Society of Applied Physics
