= Kazushi Kanoda =

Japanese physicist (1958–)

- 鹿野田 一司
- Born: January 22, 1958 (age 68); Nakaniida, Miyagi, Japan (current Kami)
- Education: Tohoku University (B.Eng.); Kyoto University (D.Eng.)
- Known for: Kanoda diagram
- Awards: Nishina Memorial Prize (2020); Humboldt Research Award (2024)
- Scientific career
- Fields: Solid state physics
- Workplaces: University of Stuttgart; Max Planck Institute for Solid State Research; The University of Tokyo; Institute for Molecular Science; Gakushuin University

Kazushi Kanoda (Japanese: 鹿野田 一司, born 22 January 1958) is a Japanese physicist and Professor Emeritus of the University of Tokyo, specializing in the nuclear magnetic resonance measurement of organic conductors.

== Early life and career ==
Kanoda was born in Nakaniida (current Kami), Miyagi Prefecture and he graduated from Miyagi Prefectural Sendai Daini Senior High School. He graduated from the Faculty of Engineering, Tohoku University in 1981 and earned his D.Eng. from Graduate School of Engineering, Kyoto University in 1986, where he researched the superconductivity of artificial superlattices.

He engaged in research as a researcher at the Institute for Chemical Research, Kyoto University, for a year, and then took up a position as a research associate in the Department of Physics, Faculty of Science, at Gakushuin University in 1987. From 1991 to 1997, he served as an associate professor at the Institute for Molecular Science.

In 1997, he became an associate professor in the Department of Applied Physics at the University of Tokyo. He served as a professor there from 1999 until his retirement in 2023, after which he became an emeritus professor at the university.

Following his retirement, while holding a position as a specially appointed researcher at the Graduate School of Frontier Sciences at the University of Tokyo, he relocated his research base to Germany, where he has served as a Senior Research Fellow at the Max Planck Institute for Solid State Research and as a visiting professor at the Institute of Physics at the University of Stuttgart.

== Research ==
Kanoda has pioneered the nuclear magnetic resonance measurements of organic conductors, primarily those substituted with carbon-13. While at Gakushuin University, he began researching this topic. At that time in Japan, 13C-substituted carbon disulfide (^{13}CS_{2}), which was necessary for synthesizing 13C-substituted bis(ethylenedithio)tetrathiafulvalene (BEDT-TTF), was unavailable. Furthermore, due to its volatility, ^{13}CS_{2} was prohibited from being transported by air, and there was no prospect of importing it by ship. Ultimately, he and his collaborators imported 13C-substituted methane, which could be transported by air, and synthesized ^{13}CS_{2} and the target compound, 13C-substituted BEDT-TTF, in Japan.

In 1997, he reviewed ^{13}C-NMR studies on κ-type BEDT-TTF salts, which exhibited a wide range of properties, from metallic and Mott insulating states to superconductivity. He also proposed a general phase diagram for this class of materials that is sometimes referred to as the Kanoda diagram in some literature.

His research has also covered the quantum spin liquid state and the quantum criticality of the Mott transition in organic conductors.

== Awards ==
Kanoda received an IBM Japan Science Prize in 1998 and a MEXT Prize for Science and Technology in 2019.

In 2020, he received the Nishina Memorial Prize for his "study of strongly correlated quantum liquids in organic conductors". He also received a Humboldt Research Award in 2024.
