= Masaki Oshikawa =

Japanese theoretical physicist (1968–)

- 押川 正毅
- Born: January 12, 1968 (age 58); Innoshima, Hiroshima, Japan (current Onomichi)
- Education: The University of Tokyo
- Awards: APS Fellow (2019); Nishina Memorial Prize (2025)
- Scientific career
- Fields: Condensed matter physics Statistical mechanics Quantum field theory
- Workplaces: The Ohio State University; The University of Tokyo; Kavli Institute for the Physics and Mathematics of the Universe; Tokyo Institute of Technology
- Thesis: Hidden symmetry and phase transitions in quantum spin chains with general integer spin (1995)
- Academic advisors: Takeo Izuyama

Masaki Oshikawa (Japanese: 押川 正毅, born 12 January 1968) is a Japanese theoretical physicist specializing in condensed matter physics, statistical mechanics, and quantum field theory. He is an Ohio Eminent Scholar and professor at the Ohio State University and a senior fellow at the Institute for Solid State Physics, the University of Tokyo.

== Early life and career ==
Oshikawa was born in Innoshima, Hiroshima. He graduated from Kaisei Academy in 1986 and the Department of Physics, Faculty of Science, the University of Tokyo in 1990. He completed a master's program under Takeo Izuyama at the same university in 1992. In 1994, he withdrew from the doctoral program to take up a position as a research associate in the Department of Applied Physics, Faculty of Engineering, at the University of Tokyo. He received a D.Sc. from the University of Tokyo in 1995.

In 1995, he conducted research as a Killam Memorial Postdoctoral Fellow under Ian Affleck at the University of British Columbia in Canada. He subsequently became an associate professor at the Tokyo Institute of Technology in 1998, and a professor at the Institute for Solid State Physics, the University of Tokyo, in 2006. Since 2016, he has also held the position of visiting senior scientist at the Kavli Institute for the Physics and Mathematics of the Universe.

In 2019, he was elected a Fellow of the American Physical Society for his "fundamental contributions to the theory of topology, dynamics, and order in quantum many body systems".

In August 2025, the Ohio State University announced the approval of his appointment as a professor at the university. In April 2026, he assumed the position of senior fellow at the Institute for Solid State Physics, the University of Tokyo, while also taking up an eminent scholar at the Ohio State University.

== Research ==
Oshikawa has performed theoretical research including quantum many-body theory, quantum spin systems, and quantum field theory. He began his research on quantum spin systems after attending a lecture by Hal Tasaki at the Summer School for Young Researchers in Condensed Matter Physics during the first year of his master's program.

In his first paper, published in 1992, he discussed the generalization of the Kennedy-Tasaki transformation for arbitrary spin quantum number S, and demonstrated that hidden symmetry breaking depends on whether S is even or odd. This concept was later systematized as a symmetry-protected topological (SPT) phase.

In 1997, he, together with Masanori Yamanaka and Ian Affleck, applied the Lieb-Schultz-Mattis theorem to one-dimensional quantum spin systems in a magnetic field and to one-dimensional many-body systems. In 2000, he also extended and generalized the theorem to multidimensional many-body systems, providing a universal guiding principle in the search for non-trivial quantum phases, including SPT phases.

== Awards ==
- 2003: Ryogo Kubo Memorial Prize
- 2005: the Society of Electron Spin Science and Technology Award for Young Scientist
- 2008: the Japan Society for the Promotion of Science Prize
- 2022: MEXT Prize for Science and Technology
- 2025: Nishina Memorial Prize
