= Toshihide Maskawa =

Japanese theoretical physicist (1940–2021)

- 益川 敏英
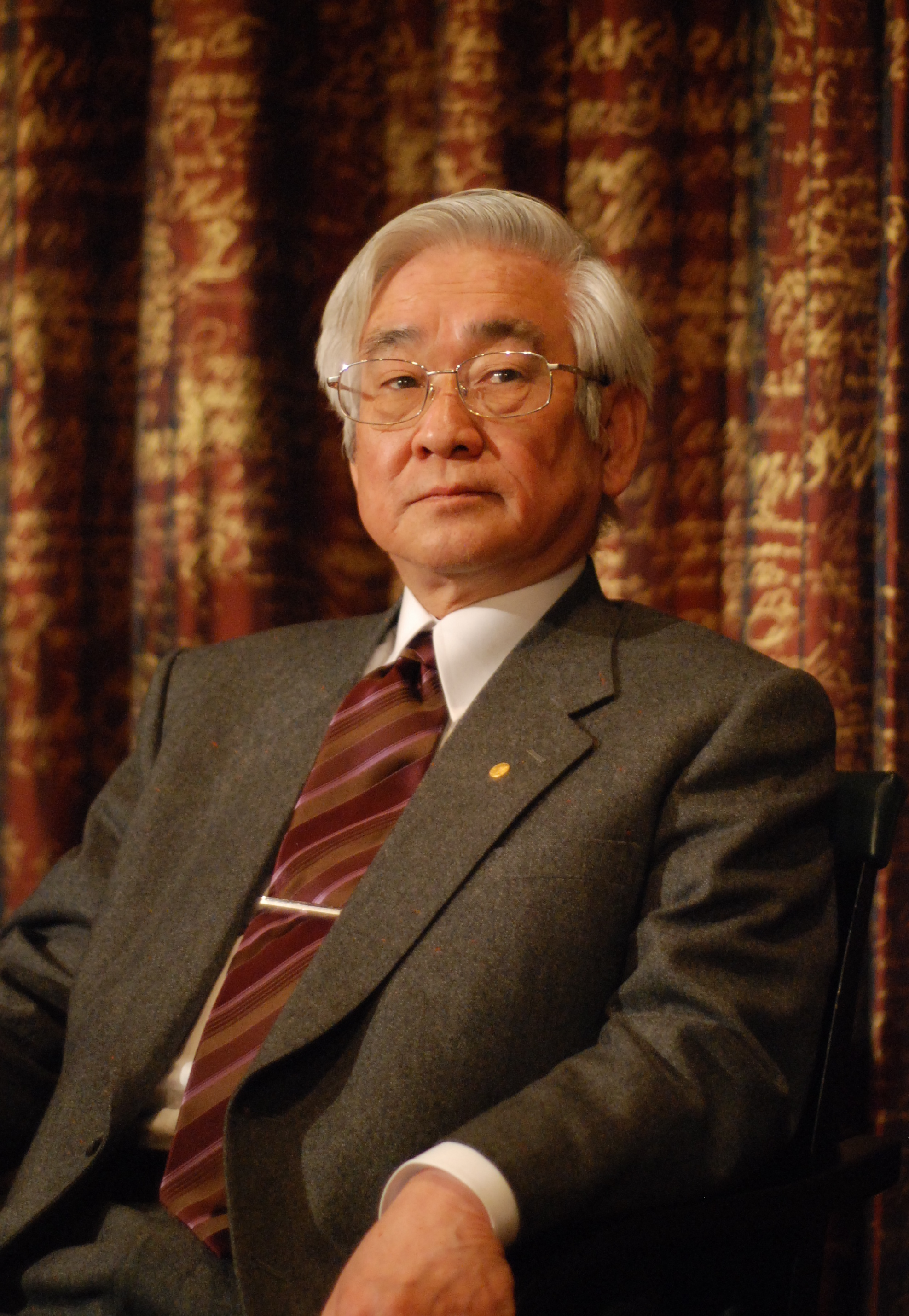
- Maskawa in 2008
- Born: 7 February 1940; Nagoya, Japan
- Died: 23 July 2021 (aged 81); Kyoto, Japan
- Education: Nagoya University
- Known for: Work on CP violation CKM matrix
- Spouse: Akiko Takahashi
- Children: 2
- Scientific career
- Fields: High energy physics (theory)
- Workplaces: Nagoya University; Kyoto University; Kyoto Sangyo University
- Thesis: 粒子と共鳴準位の混合効果について. (1967)
- Doctoral advisor: Shoichi Sakata

Toshihide Maskawa (or Masukawa) (益川 敏英, Masukawa Toshihide; 7 February 1940 – 23 July 2021) was a Japanese theoretical physicist known for his work on CP-violation who was awarded one quarter of the 2008 Nobel Prize in Physics "for the discovery of the origin of the broken symmetry which predicts the existence of at least three families of quarks in nature."

== Early life and education ==
Maskawa was born in Nagoya, Japan. After World War II ended, the Maskawa family operated as sugar wholesalers. A native of Aichi Prefecture, Toshihide Maskawa graduated from Nagoya University in 1962 and received a Ph.D. degree in particle physics from the same university in 1967. His doctoral advisor was the physicist Shoichi Sakata.

From early life Maskawa liked trivia, and studied mathematics, chemistry, linguistics and various books. In high school, he loved novels, especially detective and mystery stories and novels by Ryūnosuke Akutagawa.

== Career ==
At Kyoto University in the early 1970s, he collaborated with Makoto Kobayashi on explaining broken symmetry (the CP violation) within the Standard Model of particle physics. Maskawa and Kobayashi's theory required that there be at least three generations of quarks, a prediction that was confirmed experimentally four years later by the discovery of the bottom quark.

Maskawa and Kobayashi's 1973 article, "CP Violation in the Renormalizable Theory of Weak Interaction", is the fourth most cited high energy physics paper of all time as of 2010. The Cabibbo–Kobayashi–Maskawa matrix, which defines the mixing parameters between quarks, was the result of this work. Kobayashi and Maskawa were jointly awarded half of the 2008 Nobel Prize in Physics for this work, with the other half going to Yoichiro Nambu.

Maskawa was director of the Yukawa Institute for Theoretical Physics from 1997 to 2003. He was special professor and director general of the Kobayashi-Maskawa Institute for the Origin of Particles and the Universe at Nagoya University, director of the Maskawa Institute for Science and Culture at Kyoto Sangyo University and professor emeritus at Kyoto University.

== Nobel lecture ==
On 8 December 2008, after Maskawa told the audience "Sorry, I cannot speak English", he delivered his Nobel lecture on “What Did CP Violation Tell Us?” in Japanese language, at Stockholm University. The audience followed the subtitles on the screen behind him.

== Personal life ==
Maskawa married Akiko Takahashi in 1967. The couple have two children, Kazuki and Tokifuji.

== Death ==
On 23 July 2021, on the same day as the opening ceremony of the Tokyo Summer Olympic Games, Maskawa died of oral cancer at his home in Kyoto at the age of 81; his death was unrelated to the triple disaster and COVID-19 infection. He was cremated in October 2021 after a private funeral.

== Professional record ==
- July 1967 – Research Associate of the Faculty of Science, Nagoya University
- May 1970 – Research Associate of the Faculty of Science, Kyoto University
- April 1976 – Associate Professor of the Institute for Nuclear Study, University of Tokyo
- April 1980 – Professor of the Research Institute for Fundamental Physics (present Yukawa Institute for Theoretical Physics), Kyoto University
- November 1990 – Professor of the Faculty of Science, Kyoto University
- 1995 – Councilor, Kyoto University
- 1997
  - January – Professor of the Yukawa Institute for Theoretical Physics, Kyoto University
  - April – Director of the Yukawa Institute for Theoretical Physics, Kyoto University
- 2003
  - April – Professor Emeritus of Kyoto University
  - April – Professor of Kyoto Sangyo University (till May 2009)
- October 2004 – Director of the Research Institute, Kyoto Sangyo University
- October 2007 – Distinguished Invited University Professor of Nagoya University
- 2009
  - February – Trustee of Kyoto Sangyo University
  - March – University Professor of Nagoya University
  - June – Head of Maskawa Juku and Professor, Kyoto Sangyo University (till March 2019)
- 2010
  - April – Director of the Kobayashi-Maskawa Institute for the Origin of Particles and the Universe (KMI) at Nagoya University
  - December – Member of the Japan Academy
- 2018
  - April – Director Emeritus of KMI at Nagoya University
- April 2019 – Professor Emeritus of Kyoto Sangyo University

== Recognition ==
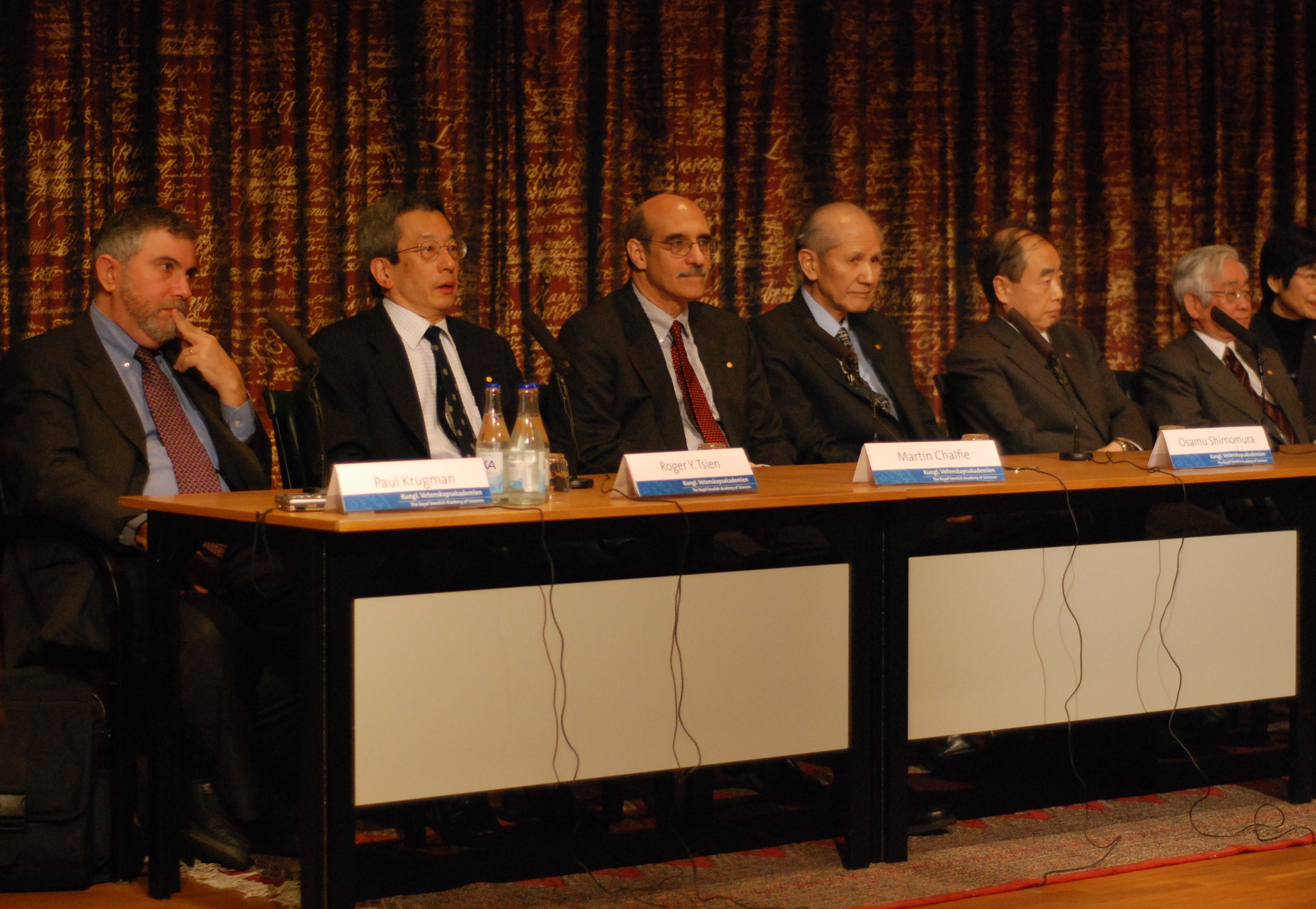
Paul Krugman, Roger Tsien, Martin Chalfie, Osamu Shimomura, Makoto Kobayashi and Toshihide Masukawa, Nobel Prize Laureates 2008, at a press conference at the Swedish Academy of Science in Stockholm

- 1979 – Nishina Memorial Prize
- 1985 – Sakurai Prize
- 1985 – Japan Academy Prize
- 1995 – Chunichi Culture Award
- 1995 – Asahi Prize
- 2007 – High Energy and Particle Physics Prize by European Physical Society
- 2008 – Nobel Prize in Physics
- 2008 – Order of Culture
- 2010 – Member of Japan Academy

== Political proposition ==
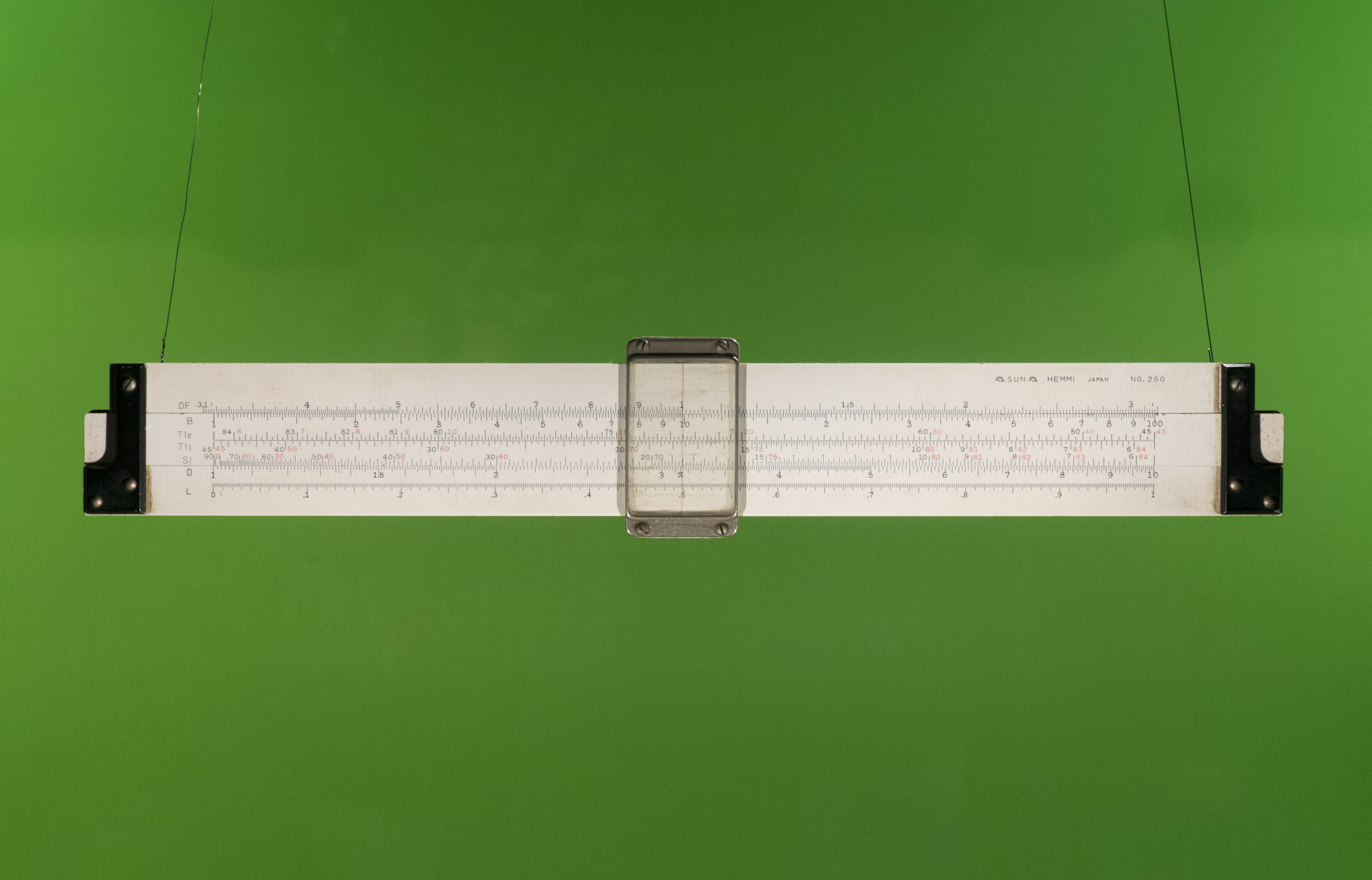
Maskawa's slide rule on display at the Nobel Prize Museum

In 2013, Maskawa and chemistry Nobel laureate Hideki Shirakawa issued a statement against the Japanese State Secrecy Law." The following is Maskawa's main political proposition:

- Support for Article 9 of the Japanese Constitution
- Criticizing Japanese politician visits to the Yasukuni Shrine
- Support for selective couple surname system

== See also ==
- Progress of Theoretical Physics
- List of Japanese Nobel laureates
- List of Nobel laureates affiliated with Kyoto University
