= Yuanbo Zhang =

Chinese physicist

Yuanbo Zhang is a condensed matter physicist and a professor of physics at Fudan University. He is known for his work on the electronic properties of low-dimensional systems.

== Education and career ==
He studied physics at Peking University and earned his bachelor's degree in 2000, and a doctorate at Columbia University in 2006 under the supervision of Philip Kim, they work on graphene almost at the same time with Geim and Novoselov. Zhang worked at the University of California, Berkeley as a Miller Research Fellow until 2009, when he joined the faculty at Fudan University. He joined the faculty at Fudan University in 2009.

== Awards and honours ==
Zhang won the IUPAP(International Union of Pure and Applied Physics) Young Scientist Prize (C8), in 2010. He was awarded the second Nishina Asia award for "his outstanding contributions to the elucidation of electronic properties of monolayer and bilayer graphene."
