= Makoto Kobayashi =

Japanese physicist (born 1944)

- 小林 誠
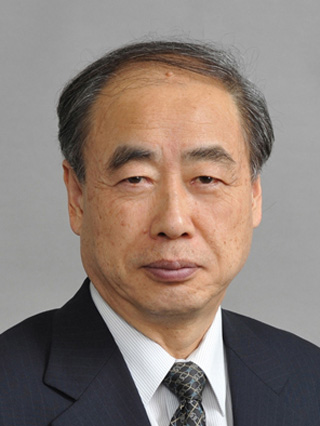
- Born: April 7, 1944 (age 82); Nagoya, Empire of Japan
- Citizenship: Japan
- Education: Nagoya University
- Known for: Work on CP violation CKM matrix
- Awards: Sakurai Prize (1985); Japan Academy Prize (1985); Asahi Prize (1995); High Energy and Particle Physics Prize (2007); Nobel Prize in Physics (2008)
- Scientific career
- Fields: High energy physics (theory)
- Workplaces: Kyoto University; High Energy Accelerator Research Organization
- Doctoral advisor: Shoichi Sakata

Makoto Kobayashi (小林 誠, Kobayashi Makoto; born April 7, 1944) is a Japanese physicist known for his work on CP-violation who was awarded one-fourth of the 2008 Nobel Prize in Physics "for the discovery of the origin of the broken symmetry which predicts the existence of at least three families of quarks in nature."

== Early life and education ==
Makoto Kobayashi was born in Nagoya, Japan in 1944. When he was two years old, Kobayashi's father Hisashi died. The Kobayashi family home was destroyed by the Bombing of Nagoya, so they stayed at his mother's (surnamed Kaifu) family house. One of Makoto's cousins, Toshiki Kaifu, the 51st Prime Minister of Japan, was living in the same place. His other cousin was an astronomer, Norio Kaifu. Many years later, Toshiki Kaifu recalled Kobayashi: "when he was a child, he was a quiet and lovely boy, always reading some difficult books in my room. I think this is the beginning of his sudden change into a genius."

After graduating from the School of Science of Nagoya University in 1967, he obtained a DSc degree from the Graduate School of Science of Nagoya University in 1972. During college years, he received guidance from Shoichi Sakata and others.

== Career ==
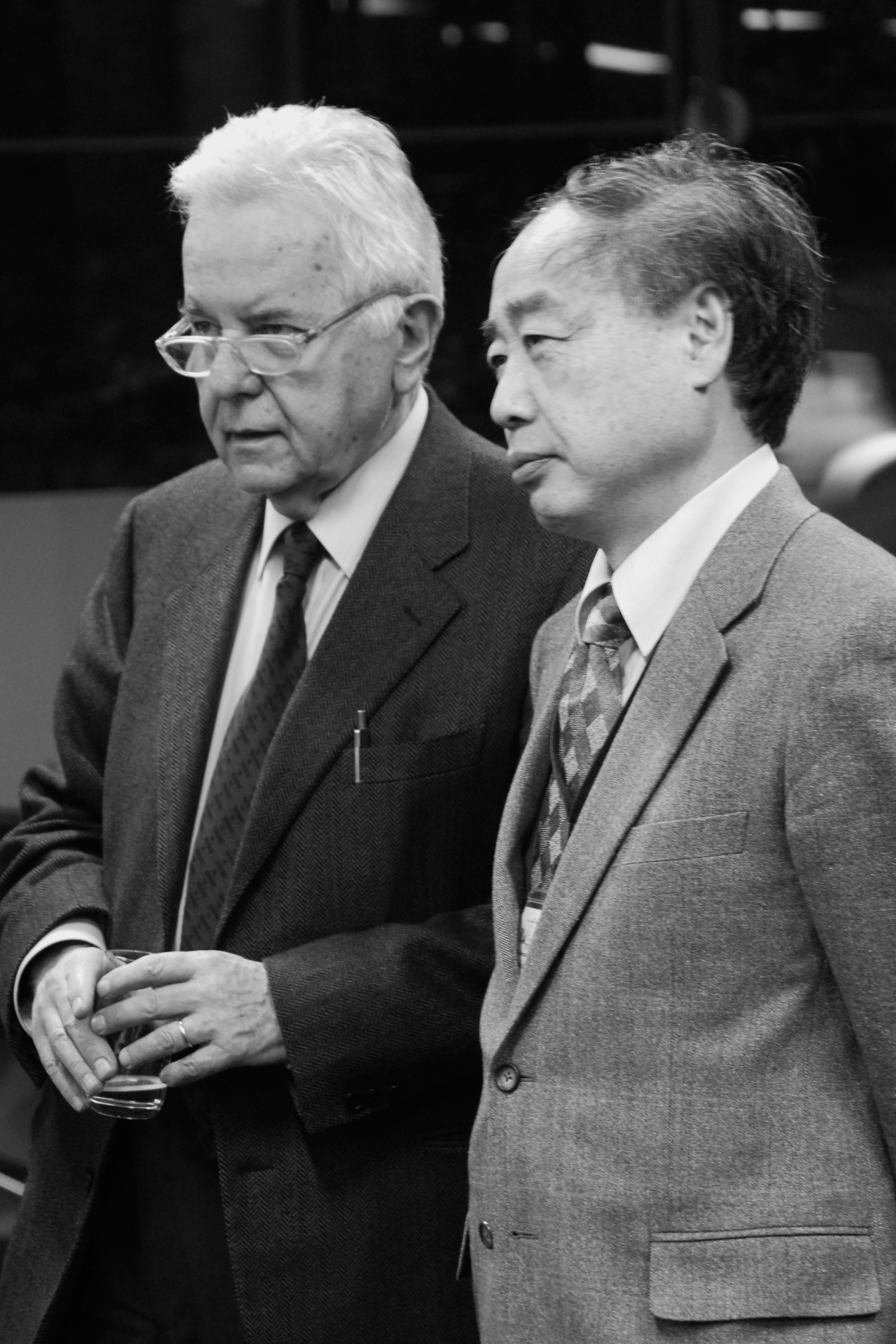
Nicola Cabibbo and Makoto Kobayashi

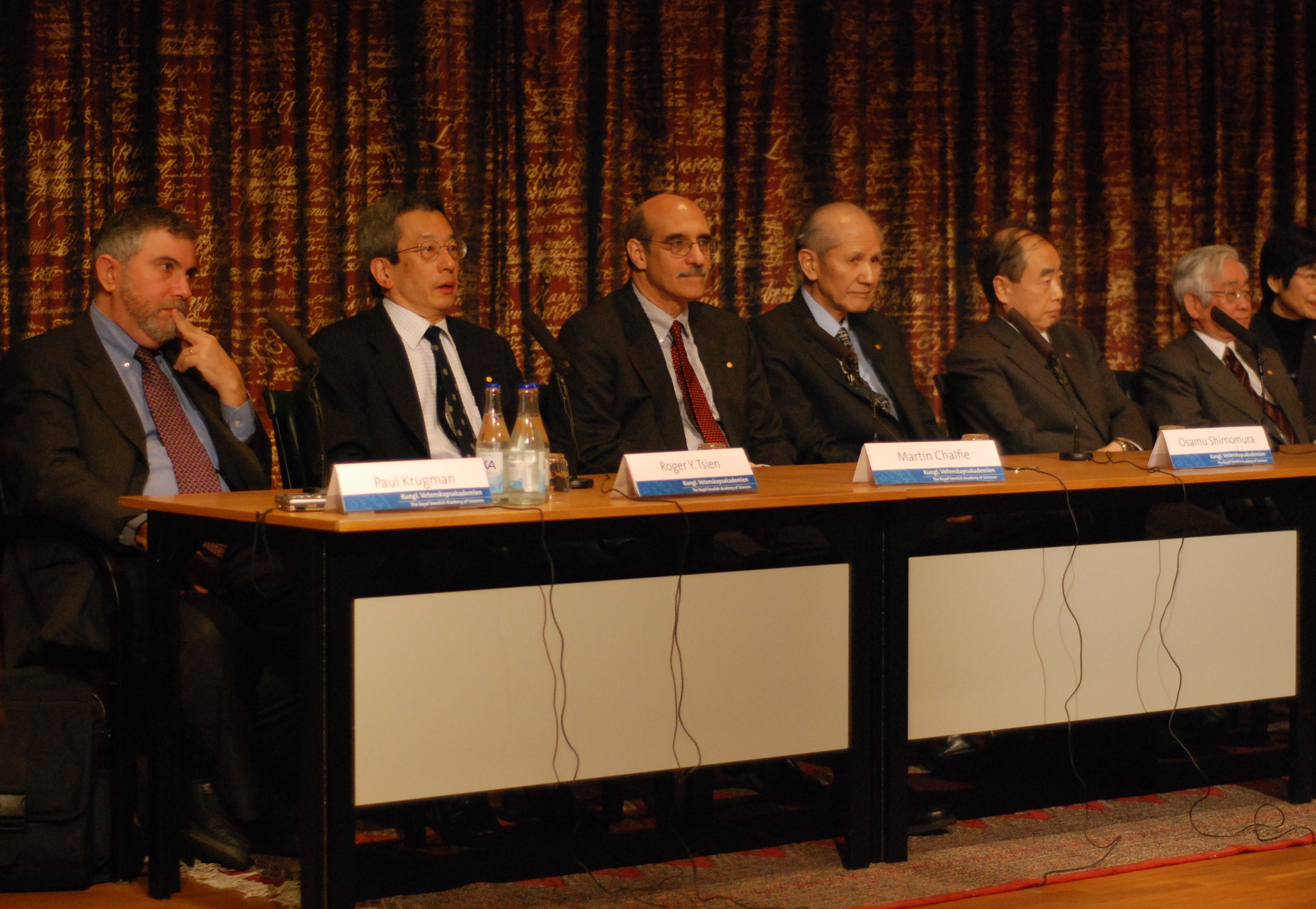
Paul Krugman, Roger Tsien, Martin Chalfie, Osamu Shimomura, Makoto Kobayashi and Toshihide Masukawa, Nobel Prize Laureates 2008, at a press conference at the Swedish Academy of Science in Stockholm

After completing his doctoral research at Nagoya University in 1972, Kobayashi worked as a research associate on particle physics at Kyoto University. Together, with his colleague Toshihide Maskawa, he worked on explaining CP-violation within the Standard Model of particle physics. Kobayashi and Maskawa's theory required that there were at least three generations of quarks, a prediction that was confirmed experimentally four years later by the discovery of the bottom quark.

Kobayashi and Maskawa's article, "CP Violation in the Renormalizable Theory of Weak Interaction", published in 1973, is the fourth most cited high energy physics paper of all time as of 2010. The Cabibbo–Kobayashi–Maskawa matrix, which defines the mixing parameters between quarks was the result of this work. Kobayashi and Maskawa were jointly awarded half of the 2008 Nobel Prize in Physics for this work, with the other half going to Yoichiro Nambu.

In recognition of three Nobel laureates' contributions, the bronze statues of Shin'ichirō Tomonaga, Leo Esaki, and Makoto Kobayashi was set up in the Central Park of Azuma 2 in Tsukuba City in 2015.

== Professional record ==
- April 1972 – Research Associate of the Faculty of Science, Kyoto University
- July 1979 – Associate Professor of the National Laboratory of High Energy Physics (KEK)
- April 1989 – Professor of the National Laboratory of High Energy Physics (KEK), Head of Physics Division II
- April 1997 – Professor of the Institute of Particle and Nuclear Science, KEK, Head of Physics Division II
- April 2003 – Director, Institute of Particle and Nuclear Studies, KEK
- April 2004 – Trustee (Director, Institute of Particle and Nuclear Studies), KEK (Inter-University Research Institute Corporation)
- June 2006 – Professor Emeritus of KEK
- 2008 – Distinguished Invited University Professor of Nagoya University
- 2009
  - Special Honored Professor of KEK
  - Trustee and Director of Academic System Institute, Japan Society for the Promotion of Science
  - University Professor of Nagoya University
- 2010
  - Chairperson of the Advisory Committee of the Kobayashi-Maskawa Institute for the Origin of Particles and the Universe (KMI) at Nagoya University
  - Member of the Japan Academy
- 2016 – Superadvisor of Yokohama Science Frontier High School
- 2018
  - April – Director of the Kobayashi-Maskawa Institute for the Origin of Particles and the Universe (KMI) at Nagoya University
- 2019 – Second Honorary Director of the Nagoya City Science Museum
- 2020
  - April – Director Emeritus of KMI at Nagoya University

== Recognition ==
- 1979 – Nishina Memorial Prize
- 1985 – Sakurai Prize
- 1994 – Chunichi Culture Award
- 1995 – Asahi Prize
- 2001 – Person of Cultural Merit
- 2007 – High Energy and Particle Physics Prize by European Physical Society
- 2008 – Nobel Prize in Physics
- 2008 – Order of Culture, awards ceremony was held at the Tokyo Imperial Palace
- 2010 – Member of Japan Academy

== Personal life ==
Kobayashi was born and educated in Nagoya, Japan. He married Sachiko Enomoto in 1975; they had one son, Junichiro. After his first wife died, Kobayashi married Emiko Nakayama in 1990, they had a daughter, Yuka.

== See also ==
- Progress of Theoretical Physics
- List of Nobel laureates affiliated with Kyoto University
- List of Japanese Nobel laureates
