= Norio Kaifu =

Japanese astronomer (1943–2019)

- 海部宣男
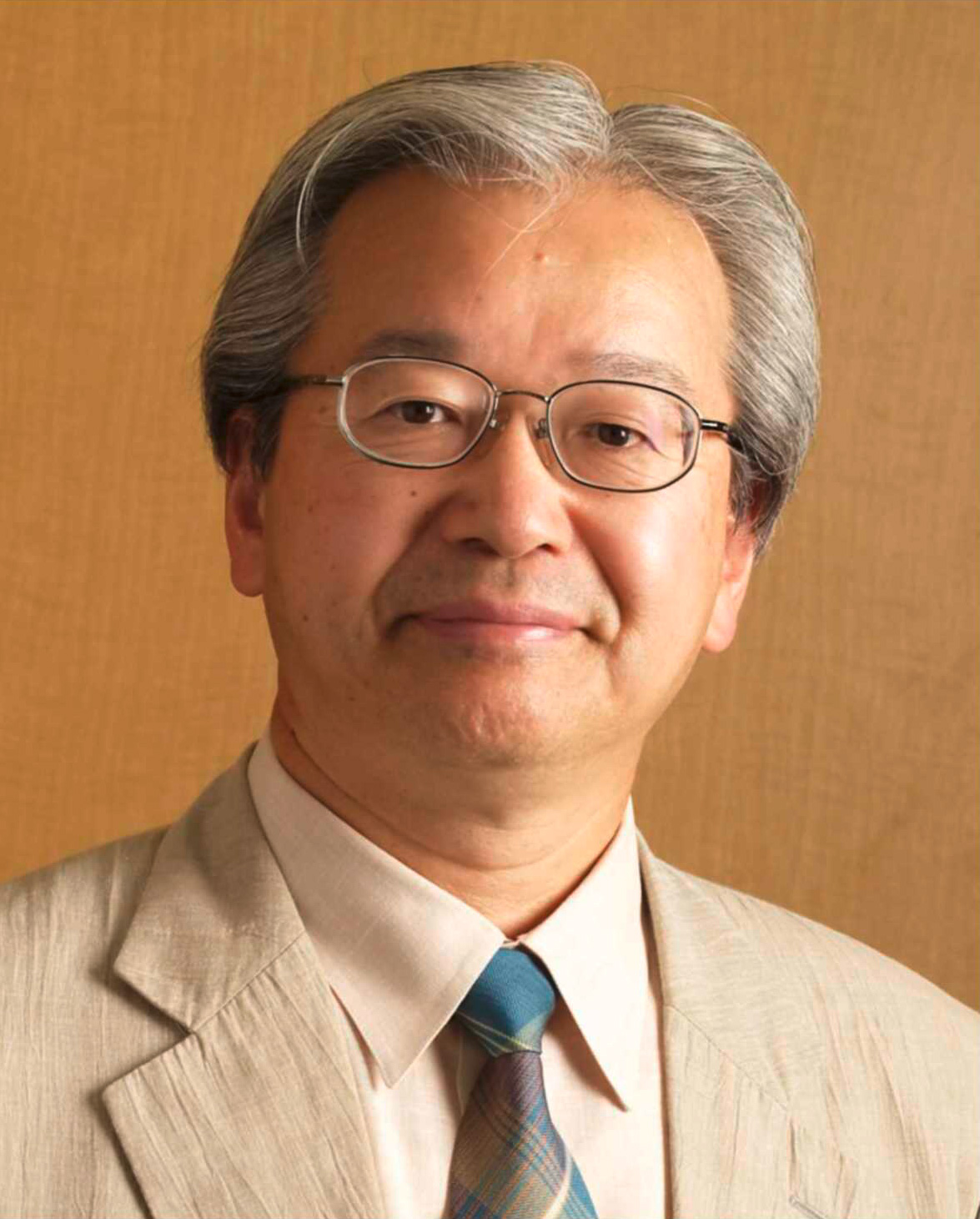
- Kaifu in 2015
- Born: 21 September 1943
- Died: 13 April 2019 (aged 75)
- Education: University of Tokyo
- Known for: President of International Astronomical Union from 2012–2015
- Awards: Nishina Memorial Prize, 1987 Japan Academy Prize, 1997 Mainichi Book-Review Award, 2011
- Scientific career
- Fields: Astronomy
- Workplaces: National Astronomical Observatory of Japan

Norio Kaifu (海部 宣男, Kaifu Norio; 21 September 1943 – 13 April 2019) was a Japanese astronomer. He was best known as the president of the International Astronomical Union (IAU) from 2012 to 2015. He directed the Subaru telescope project, which housed the largest monolithic primary mirror in the world from its commission until 2005. Kaifu researched in radio astronomy, extragalactic astronomy, cosmic magnetic fields, non-stable stars, and infrared astronomy. The minor planet 6412 Kaifu is named in his honor.

Kaifu died of pancreatic cancer on 13 April 2019, at the age of 75.

== Career ==
Kaifu graduated from the University of Tokyo in 1972 with a PhD in radio astronomy. In the early 1980s, he organized bilateral collaborations with British astronomers, including the United Kingdom Infrared Telescope, which improved relations with international astronomers. He also began working with astronomers in China, South Korea, and Taiwan, and formed the East Asian Core Observatories Association, which built the East Asian Observatory in 2014. He became the chairman of the Radio Astronomy Division of the National Astronomical Observatory of Mitaka from 1988 to 1990, and associate director from 1992 to 1996. In 1990, he was invited to join the Japanese Large Telescope Project, and became the founding director of the Subaru telescope. The telescope still remains as one of the largest telescopes in the world. From 2000 to 2006, Kaifu was the director of the National Astronomical Observatory of Japan (NAOJ), and led the construction of the Nobeyama Radio Observatory, which became Japan's first large inter-university research facility in astronomy. He then served in the Science Council of Japan as president of the Natural Science & Engineering Division from 2005 to 2011. He acted as the single point of contact for the International Year of Astronomy 2009 in Japan. Kaifu taught at the Open University of Japan from 2007 to 2012; from 2012 to 2015, he was elected president of the International Astronomical Union (IAU). In his lifetime, he published over 150 papers and 30 books, and was a regular reviewer of the Japanese newspaper Mainichi Shimbun.

== Scientific achievements ==
Kaifu became widely known for his research into radio spectroscopy. While working on the 6-meter millimeter wave telescope at the Tokyo Astronomical Observatory, he developed radio spectrometers, which began to detect several molecules in the atmosphere after the telescope's completion in 1982. He helped develop the acousto-optical spectrometer used in the Nobeyama 45 meter radio telescope. This spectrometer had more than ten times the bandwidth and channels of other spectrometers at the time. He and his team carried out surveys of spectral lines and discovered more than a dozen molecules, most of which were organic. His work also helped develop the first clear evidence of a supermassive black hole at the center of the Milky Way. Kaifu led research on star formation and laid the foundations for fields such as the direct observation of exoplanets and the evolution of protoplanetary disks.

== Personal life ==
Kaifu is a cousin to Nobel laureate physicist Makoto Kobayashi and former Japanese prime minister Toshiki Kaifu.

== Awards ==
- Nishina Memorial Prize (1987) for works on millimeter astronomy
- Japan Academy Prize (1997) for research on interstellar matter
- Mainichi Book-Review Award (2011)

== See also ==
- List of astronomers § N. Kaifu
