= Hirotaka Sugawara =

Japanese physicist

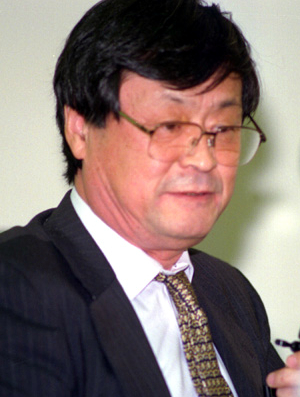
- Panel Discussion, October 1999
- Born: March 15, 1938 (age 88); Japan
- Education: Tokyo University
- Known for: "Lee-Sugawara Relation" and "A Field Theory of Currents" aka "Sugawara Construction" of the energy-momentum tensor
- Awards: Nishina Memorial Prize (1971), Toray Science and Technology Prize (1996),
- Scientific career
- Fields: Physics, Theoretical Study of Particle Physics
- Workplaces: Tokyo University of Education; Tokyo University; KEK; University of Hawaii; Graduate University for Advanced Studies; Japan Society for the Promotion of Science; Okinawa Institute of Science and Technology

Hirotaka Sugawara (菅原 寛孝, Sugawara Hirotaka; born March 15, 1938) is a Japanese physicist, specializing in the theoretical study of particle physics. He is known for the "Lee-Sugawara relation" and "A Field Theory of Currents" aka "Sugawara Construction" of the energy-momentum tensor.

== Early life ==
Sugawara was born in 1938 as a son of a Zen Buddhist in Miyagi, Japan. He obtained his BSc in Physics (1961), MSc in Physics (1963), and PhD in Physics (1966), from the University of Tokyo.

== Academic career ==
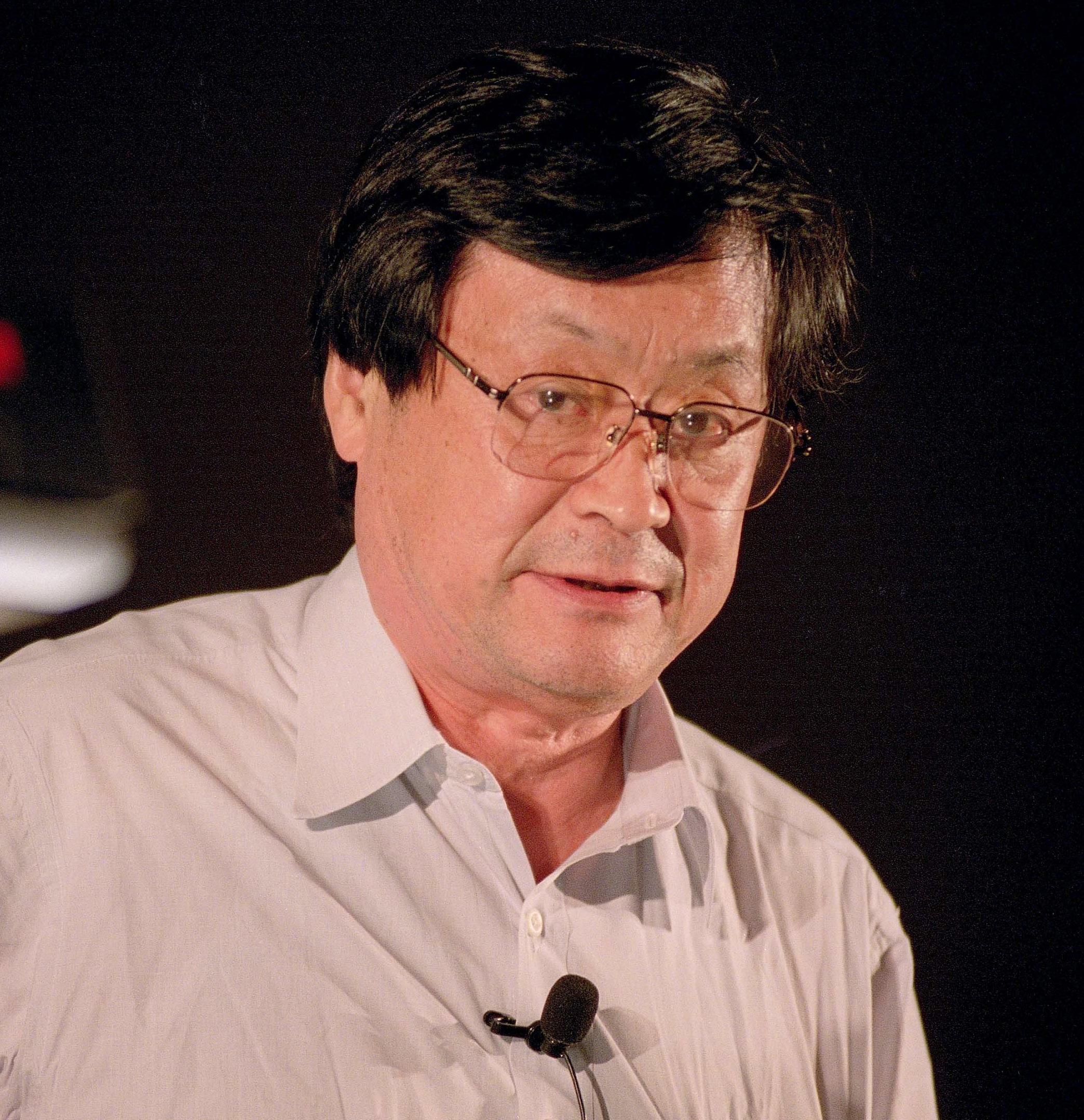
Sugawara attended the Snowmass Conference (July 2, 2001)

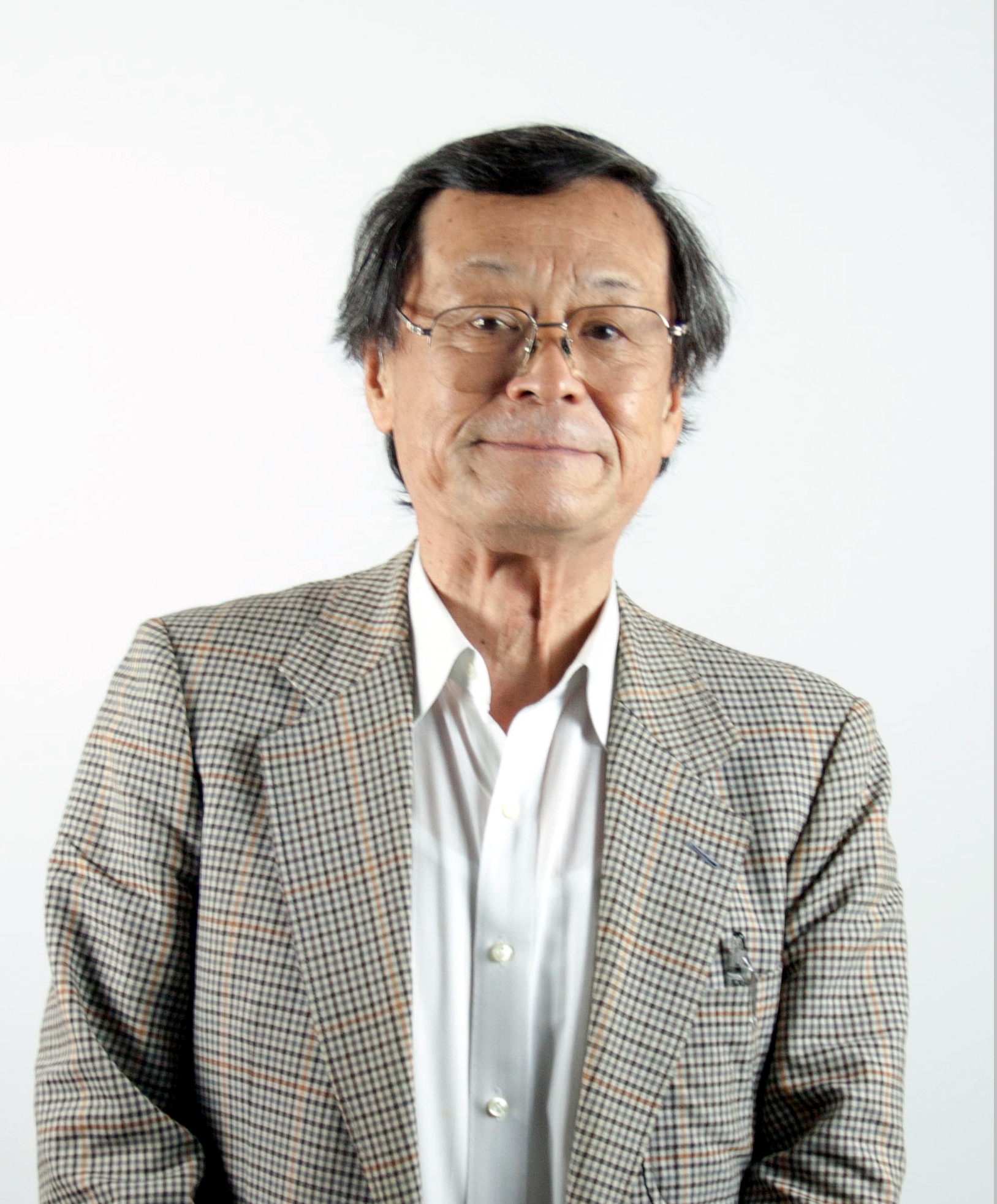
Sugawara established Advanced Medical Instrumentation Unit at Okinawa Institute of Science and Technology

When Sugawara was still a graduate student at the University of Tokyo, he derived a relation for non-leptonic hyperon decay amplitudes called "Lee-Sugawara relation" while studying the symmetry of weak interactions. He received his doctorate from the University of Tokyo in 1966, and has held postdoctoral research positions at Cornell University, University of California, Berkeley, and University of Chicago. Upon his return to Japan in 1968, he became a research associate at Tokyo University of Education, and he joined the University of Tokyo as an assistant professor in 1971. "A Field Theory of Currents" is known as the ""Sugawara model," a dynamical model of local currents, in which the energy momentum tensor was expressed as a product of currents," which opened the door to the algebraic formulation of field theories.

In 1975, he was promoted to a full professor at the National Laboratory for High Energy Physics (today known as High Energy Accelerator Research Organization (KEK)), where he served as the Director General from 1989 to 2003. While serving as the Director General at KEK, he concurrently held positions (professor, councilor, Dean, and steering committee member) at various organizations such as the Graduate University for Advanced Studies (SOKENDAI), National Institute for Physiological Science (NIPS), National Institute of Polar Research (NIPR), National Institute for Fusion Science (NIFS), Okazaki National Research Institutes, and Institutes of Space and Astronautical Science (ISAS). He also served as a Chair of the International Committee for Future Accelerators (ICFA), a working group of the International Union of Pure and Applied Physics, from 1999 to 2002. KEKB, also called a B-factory for its copious production of B-mesons, is a particle accelerator used in the Belle experiment to study CP violation. He contributed significantly to the B-factory project as the Director General of KEK (the Japanese National Laboratory for High Energy Physics). He also provided strong leadership in setting up the long-baseline neutrino oscillation experiment connecting the proton synchrotron at KEK (the High Energy Accelerator Research Organization) and Super-Kamiokande (Super-Kamioka Neutrino Detection Experiment, abbreviated to Super-K or SK) in Kamioka, Gifu. He led the launch of J-PARC (Japan Proton Accelerator Research Complex) that was jointly developed between KEK and JAEA (the Japan Atomic Energy Agency).

After serving as the Director General of KEK for 14 years, he became a Professor Emeritus at KEK and a professor at University of Hawaii, Manoa, in 2003. Concurrently he also served on the Mombusho Council for Research, and for other science councils in Japan. In 2004, he held an Executive Director position at Sokendai Graduate University for Advanced Studies. He became a Director (Washington DC Office) of Japanese Society for the Promotion of Science (JSPS) in 2008.

Since 2012, he has been serving Okinawa Institute of Science and Technology (OIST) as a Distinguished Professor and also as a Special Advisor to the President.

== Awards and honors ==
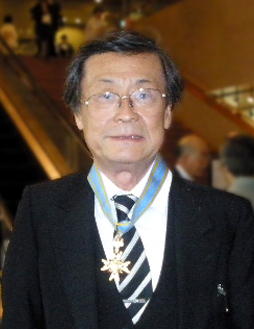
Sugawara wore the Order of the Sacred Treasure, Gold Rays with Neck Ribbon around his neck. (May 13, 2013)

- 17th Nishina Memorial Prize, 1971
- 36th Toray Science and Technology Prize, 1996
- Medal of Honor with Purple Ribbon, Japan, 1999
- Order of the Sacred Treasure, Gold Rays with Neck Ribbon, 2013

== Selected publications ==
- Hirotaka Sugawara, "Application of Current Commutation Rules to Nonleptonic Decay of Hyperons", Physical Review Letters, Vol.15, Issue 22, American Physical Society, November 29, 1965, pp. 870–873. ISSN 0031-9007
- Hirotaka Sugawara, "A Field Theory of Currents", Physical Review, Vol.170, Issue 5, American Physical Society, June 25, 1968, pp. 1659–1662. ISSN 0031-899X[3]
- Tohru Eguchi and Hirotaka Sugawara, "Extended model of elementary particles based on an analogy with superconductivity", Physical Review D, Vol.10, Issue 12, American Physical Society, December 15, 1974, pp. 4257–4262. ISSN 1550-7998
- H. Sugawara, "Isobar production and the SU3 symmetry", Physics Letters, Vol.9, Issue 1, Elsevier, March 15, 1964, pp. 60–62.
- Hirotaka Sugawara, "Application of Current Commutation Rules to Nonleptonic Decay of Hyperons", Physical Review Letters, Vol.15, Issue 25, American Physical Society, December 20, 1965, pp. 870–873. ISSN 0031-9007
- Hirotaka Sugawara and Frank von Hippel, "Zero-Parameter Model of the N–N Potential", Physical Review, Vol.172, Issue 5, American Physical Society, August 25, 1968, pp. 1764–1788. ISSN 0031-899X
- Hirotaka Sugawara, "Theory of Currents-How to Break the Symmetry", Physical Review Letters, Vol.21, Issue 11, American Physical Society, September 9, 1968, pp. 772–775. ISSN 0031-9007
- Jiro Arafune and Hirotaka Sugawara, "Breakdown of the Pomeranchuk Theorem and the Behavior of the Leading J-Plane Singularity", Physical Review Letters, Vol.25, Issue 21, American Physical Society, November 23, 1970, pp. 1516–1518. ISSN 0031-9007
- Hirotaka Sugawara, "Relativistic collective motion", Physical Review D, Vol.12, Issue 10, American Physical Society, November 15, 1975, pp. 3272–3278. ISSN 1550-7998
- Sandip Pakvasa and Hirotaka Sugawara, "CP violation in the six-quark model", Physical Review D, Vol.14, Issue 1, American Physical Society, July 1, 1976, pp. 305–308. ISSN 1550-7998
- Hirotaka Sugawara, "Theory of quark confinement based on an analogy with a theory of magnetic monopoles", Physical Review D, Vol.14, Issue 10, American Physical Society, November 15, 1976, pp. 2764–2772. ISSN 1550-7998
- Sandip Pakvasa and Hirotaka Sugawara, "Evading the axion without massless quarks", Physical Review D, Vol.19, Issue 7, American Physical Society, April 1, 1979, pp. 2225–2226. ISSN 1550-7998
- Hirotaka Sugawara, "Dynamical calculation of quark, lepton, and gauge-boson masses", Physical Review D, Vol.30, Issue 11, American Physical Society, December 1, 1984, pp. 2396–2407. ISSN 1550-7998
- Hirotaka Sugawara, "String in curved space: Use of spinor representation of a noncompact group", Physical Review Letters, Vol.56, Issue 2, American Physical Society, January 13, 1986, pp. 103–106. ISSN 0031-9007
