= Nishina Memorial Prize =

- Awarded for: Substantial contributions in the field of physics
- Country: Japan
- Presented by: Nishina Memorial Foundation
- First award: 1955
- Website: nishina-mf.or.jp

The Nishina Memorial Prize (仁科記念賞, Nishina Kinenshō) is the oldest and most prestigious physics award in Japan.

== Information ==
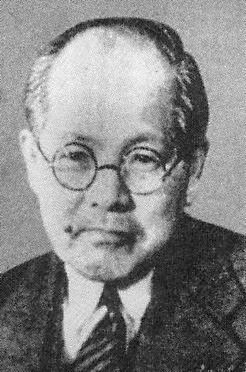
Dr. Yoshio Nishina (1890-1951)

Since 1955, the Nishina Memorial Prize has been awarded annually by the Nishina Memorial Foundation. The Foundation was established to commemorate Yoshio Nishina, who was the founding father of modern physics research in Japan and a mentor of the first two Japanese Nobel Laureates, Hideki Yukawa and Sin-Itiro Tomonaga.

The Prize, of ¥500,000 (about US$5,000) and the certificate, is bestowed upon young scientists who have made substantial contributions in the field of atomic and sub-atomic physics research. As of 2024, six Nobel Prizes have been awarded to prior Nishina recipients: Leo Esaki, Makoto Kobayashi, Toshihide Maskawa, Masatoshi Koshiba, Shuji Nakamura and Takaaki Kajita.

== Laureates ==
Notable Nishina laureates are:

- 1955: Kazuhiko Nishijima
- 1957: Ryogo Kubo (1977 Boltzmann Medal)
- 1959: Leo Esaki (1973 Nobel Prize, 1998 Japan Prize)
- 1961: Takeo Matsubara
- 1963: Chushiro Hayashi
- 1968: Jun Kondo
- 1969: Hisashi Matsuda, Hiroyuki Ikezi, Kyoji Nishikawa
- 1971: Hirotaka Sugawara
- 1972: Kyozi Kawasaki (2001 Boltzmann Medal), Kazumi Maki
- 1973: Fumitaka Sato
- 1974: Bunji Sakita
- 1976: Susumu Okubo (2006 Wigner Medal)
- 1978: Akito Arima
- 1979: Makoto Kobayashi (2008 Nobel Prize), Toshihide Maskawa (2008 Nobel Prize)
- 1982: Akira Tonomura (1998 Benjamin Franklin Medal)
- 1984: Tohru Eguchi
- 1985: Yasuo Tanaka, Sumio Iijima (2008 Kavli Prize)
- 1987: Masatoshi Koshiba (2002 Nobel Prize), Yoji Totsuka (2007 Benjamin Franklin Medal), Norio Kaifu
- 1989: Ken'ichi Nomoto (2019 Hans A. Bethe Prize)
- 1990: Yoshinori Tokura, Katsuhiko Sato
- 1992: Yoshihisa Yamamoto, Tsutomu Yanagida
- 1996: Shuji Nakamura (2002 Benjamin Franklin Medal, 2008 Prince of Asturias Award, 2014 Nobel Prize)
- 1997: Anthony Ichiro Sanda
- 1999: Kenzo Inoue, Akira Kakuto, Takaaki Kajita (2015 Nobel Prize), Yasunobu Nakamura
- 2001: Yōichirō Suzuki
- 2002: Seigo Tarucha
- 2003: Atsuto Suzuki
- 2004: Jaw-Shen Tsai
- 2005: Kōsuke Morita, Kōichirō Nishikawa
- 2006: Toshiki Tajima
- 2009: Hirosi Ooguri
- 2012: Hideo Hosono
- 2013: Hidetoshi Katori, Yoshiro Takahashi, Takahiko Kondo, Tomio Kobayashi, Shoji Asai
- 2014: Yuji Matsuda, Takashi Kobayashi, Tsuyoshi Nakaya
- 2015: Shinsei Ryu, Akira Furusaki, Tohru Motobayashi, Hiroyoshi Sakurai
- 2016: Tadashi Takayanagi
- 2017: Hiroki Takesue, Chihaya Adachi, Mahito Kohmoto
- 2018: Masaru Shibata, Koichiro Tanaka
- 2019: Yoshihiro Iwasa, Shigeru Yoshida, Aya Ishihara
- 2020: Kazushi Kanoda, Kazuma Nakazawa
- 2021: Takahisa Arima, Tsuyoshi Kimura, Masato Takita, Satoshi Miyazaki
- 2022: Eiji Saitoh, Eiichiro Komatsu
- 2023: Atsuko Ichikawa
- 2024: Susumu Shimoura, Dai Aoki, Shuichi Murakami
- 2025: Mareki Honma, Hal Tasaki, Masaki Oshikawa

== Nishina Asia Award ==
In 2012, the foundation established a parallel prize called the Nishina Asia Award. This prize was meant for "outstanding achievement by young Asian scientists" (outside Japan) in fundamental physics. The prize was given to one physicist each year.

- 2013: Shiraz Minwalla
- 2014: Yuanbo Zhang
- 2015: Ke He
- 2016: Seok Kim
- 2017: Hongming Wen
- 2018: Yu-tin Huang
- 2019: Chao-Yang Lu
- 2020: Ying Jiang
- 2021: Wang Yao
- 2022: Suvrat Raju

== See also ==
- List of physics awards
