= Shoichi Sakata =

Japanese physicist (1911–1970)

- 坂田 昌一
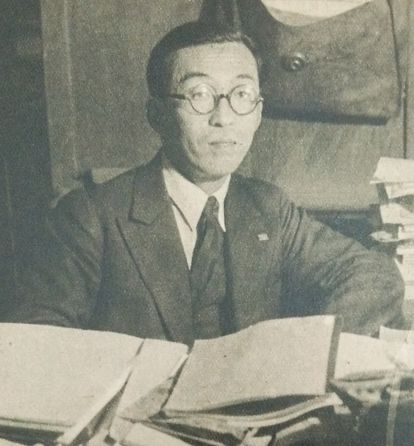
- Sakata in 1949
- Born: January 18, 1911; Tokyo, Empire of Japan
- Died: October 16, 1970 (aged 59); Nagoya, Japan
- Known for: Two meson theory Sakata model Maki–Nakagawa–Sakata matrix
- Scientific career
- Fields: Physics
- Workplaces: Nagoya University; Osaka University; Kyoto University; RIKEN
- Notable students: Makoto Kobayashi; Toshihide Maskawa

Shoichi Sakata (坂田 昌一, Sakata Shōichi; 18 January 1911 – 16 October 1970) was a Japanese physicist and Marxist who was internationally known for theoretical work on subatomic particles. He proposed the two meson theory, the Sakata model (an early precursor to the quark model), and the Pontecorvo–Maki–Nakagawa–Sakata neutrino mixing matrix.

After the end of World War II, he joined other physicists in campaigning for the peaceful uses of nuclear power.

== Life and career ==
=== Early life and education ===
Sakata was born in Tokyo, Japan, on January 18, 1911, to a family that held a tradition of public service. He was the eldest of six children of Tatsue Sakata and Mikita Sakata. At the time of Sakata's birth, Mikita was secretary to Prime Minister Katsura Tarō, who became Sakata's godfather. While attending Kōnan Middle School in Hyōgo Prefecture in 1924, Sakata was taught by the physicist Bunsaku Arakatsu. As a student at Kōnan High School from 1926 to 1929, Sakata attended a lecture by the influential physicist Jun Ishiwara. Sakata also became closely acquainted with Katō Tadashi, who later co-translated Friedrich Engels's 1883 unfinished work Dialectics of Nature into Japanese. According to Sakata, Dialectics of Nature and Vladimir Lenin's 1909 work Materialism and Empirio-criticism became formative works for his thinking.

=== Higher education and career ===
Sakata got into the Kyoto Imperial University in 1930. When he was a second-year student, Yoshio Nishina, a granduncle-in-law of Sakata, lectured on quantum mechanics at the Kyoto Imperial University. Sakata became acquainted with Hideki Yukawa and Shin'ichirō Tomonaga, the first and second Japanese Nobel laureates, through the lecture. After graduating from the university, Sakata worked with Tomonaga and Nishina at Rikagaku Kenkyusho (RIKEN) in 1933 and moved to Osaka Imperial University in 1934 to work with Yukawa. Yukawa published his first paper on the meson theory in 1935, and Sakata closely collaborated with him to develop the meson theory. Possible existence of the neutral nuclear force carrier particle π^{0} was postulated by them. Accompanied by Yukawa, Sakata moved to Kyoto Imperial University as a lecturer in 1939.

Sakata and Inoue proposed their two-meson theory in 1942. At the time, a charged particle discovered in the hard component cosmic rays was misidentified as Yukawa's meson (π^{±}, nuclear force career particle). The misinterpretation led to puzzles in the discovered cosmic ray particle. Sakata and Inoue solved these puzzles by identifying the cosmic ray particle as a daughter charged fermion produced in the π^{±} decay. A new neutral fermion was also introduced to allow π^{±} decay into fermions.

We now know that these charged and neutral fermions in the modern language correspond to the second-generation leptons μ and ν_{μ}. They then discussed the decay of the Yukawa particle,

π^{+}	→	μ^{+}	+ ν_{μ}

Sakata and Inoue predicted the correct spin assignment for the muon and introduced the second neutrino. They treated it as a distinct particle from the beta decay neutrino, and correctly anticipated the muon's three body decay. The English printing of Sakata-Inoue's two-meson theory paper was delayed until 1946, one year before the experimental discovery of π → μν decay.

Sakata moved to Nagoya Imperial University as a professor in October 1942 and remained there until his death. The university's name was changed to Nagoya University in October 1947 after the end of the Pacific War (1945). Sakata reorganized his research group in Nagoya to be administered under democratic principles after the War.

Sakata stayed at the Niels Bohr Institute from May to October 1954 at the invitation of N. Bohr and C. Møller. During his stay, Sakata gave a talk introducing works of young Japanese particle physics researchers, especially emphasizing an empirical relation found by Nakano and Nishijima, which is now known as the Nakano-Nishijima-Gell-Mann (NNG) rule among the strongly interacting particles (hadrons).

After Sakata returned to Nagoya, Sakata and his Nagoya group started research, trying to uncover the physics behind the NNG rule. Sakata then proposed his Sakata Model in 1956, which explains the NNG rule by postulating that the fundamental building blocks of all strongly interacting particles are the proton, the neutron, and the lambda baryon. The positively charged pion is made out of a proton and an antineutron, in a manner similar to the Fermi-Yang composite Yukawa meson model, while the positively charged kaon is composed of a proton and an anti-lambda, succeeding in explaining the NNG rule in the Sakata model. Aside from the integer charges, the proton, neutron, and lambda have similar properties as the up quark, down quark, and strange quark, respectively.

In 1959, Ikeda, Ogawa and Ohnuki and, independently, Yamaguchi found out the U(3) symmetry in the Sakata model. The U(3) symmetry provides a mathematical description of hadrons in the eightfold way idea (1961) of Murray Gell-Mann. Sakata's model was superseded by the quark model, proposed by Gell-Mann and George Zweig in 1964, which keeps the U(3) symmetry. However, it made the constituents fractionally charged and rejected the idea that they could be identified with observed particles. Still, within Japan, integer-charged quark models parallel to Sakata's were used until the 1970s, and are still used as effective descriptions in certain domains.

Sakata's model was used in Harry J. Lipkin's book "Lie Groups for Pedestrians" (1965). The Sakata model and its SU(3) symmetry were also explained in the textbook "Weak Interaction of Elementary Particles", L.B.Okun (1965).

In 1959, Gamba, Marshak, and Okubo found that Sakata's baryon triplet (proton, neutron, and lambda baryon) bears striking similarity to the lepton triplet (neutrino, electron, and muon) in the weak interaction aspects. To explain the physics behind this similarity in the composite model framework, in 1960, Sakata expanded his composite model to include leptons with his Nagoya University associates Maki, Nakagawa, and Ohnuki. The expanded model was termed “Nagoya Model”. Shortly thereafter, the existence of two kinds of neutrinos was experimentally confirmed. In 1962, Maki, Nakagawa, and Sakata and Katayama, Matumoto, Tanaka, and Yamada accommodated the two distinct types of neutrino into the composite model framework.

In his 1962 paper with Maki and Nakagawa, they used the Gell-Mann-Levy proposal of modified universality to define the weak mixing angle that later became known as the Cabibbo angle. They extended it to the leptons, clearly distinguishing neutrino weak and mass eigenstates, thus defining the neutrino flavor mixing angle and predicting neutrino flavor oscillations. The neutrino flavor mixing matrix is now named Maki–Nakagawa–Sakata matrix. The nontrivial neutrino mixing introduced in the Maki–Nakagawa–Sakata paper is now experimentally confirmed through the neutrino oscillation experiments.

== Influences ==
The U(3) symmetry found first in the Sakata model gave a guiding principle for constructing the quark model of Gell-Mann and Zweig. Around 1950, the two-meson theory of Sakata and Inoue became well-recognized worldwide.

The 2008 physics Nobel laureates Yoichiro Nambu, Toshihide Maskawa, and Makoto Kobayashi, who received their awards for work on symmetry breaking, all came under his tutelage and influence. The baryonic mixing in the weak current in the Nagoya Model was the inspiration for the later Cabibbo–Kobayashi–Maskawa matrix of 1973, which specifies the mismatch of quantum states of quarks, when they propagate freely and when they take part in weak interactions. Physicists, however, generally attribute the introduction of a third generation of quarks (the "top" and "bottom" quarks) into the Standard Model of the elementary particles to that 1973 paper by Kobayashi and Maskawa.

As predicted by Maki, Nakagawa, and Sakata, the neutrino oscillation phenomena have been experimentally confirmed (2015 Nobel prize in physics).

Kent Staley (2004) describes the historical background to their paper, emphasizing the largely forgotten role of theorists at Nagoya University and the "Nagoya model" they developed. Several of the Nagoya model authors embraced the philosophy of dialectical materialism, and they discuss the role that such metaphysical commitments play in physical theorizing. Both theoretical and experimental developments that generated great interest in Japan, and ultimately stimulated Kobayashi and Maskawa's 1973 work, went almost entirely unnoticed in the U.S. The episode exemplifies the importance of untestable "themata" in developing new theories and the difficulties that may arise when two parts of a research community work in relative isolation from one another.

== Missed out on the Nobel Prize ==
Shoichi Sakata's "Sakata model" inspired Murray Gell-Mann and George Zweig's quark model, but the 1969 prize was only awarded to Murray Gell-Mann. Afterward, Ivar Waller, a member of the Nobel Committee for Physics, was sorry that Sakata had not received a prize.

In September 1970, Hideki Yukawa politely wrote to Waller informing him that Sakata had been ill when the nomination was written; since then, his condition had worsened significantly. Three weeks later, Sakata died. Yukawa informed Waller that a prize to Sakata would have brought him much honor and encouragement. In the name of leading Japanese particle physicists, he asked what the Nobel committee thought of Sakata's merits, for that would perhaps bring them consolation.

== Honors ==
- Asahi Prize 1948
- Imperial Prize of the Japan Academy 1950
- Order of the Sacred Treasure (瑞宝章 Zuihōshō) 1970
