= Ryukichi Inada =

Japanese physician

- 稲田 龍吉
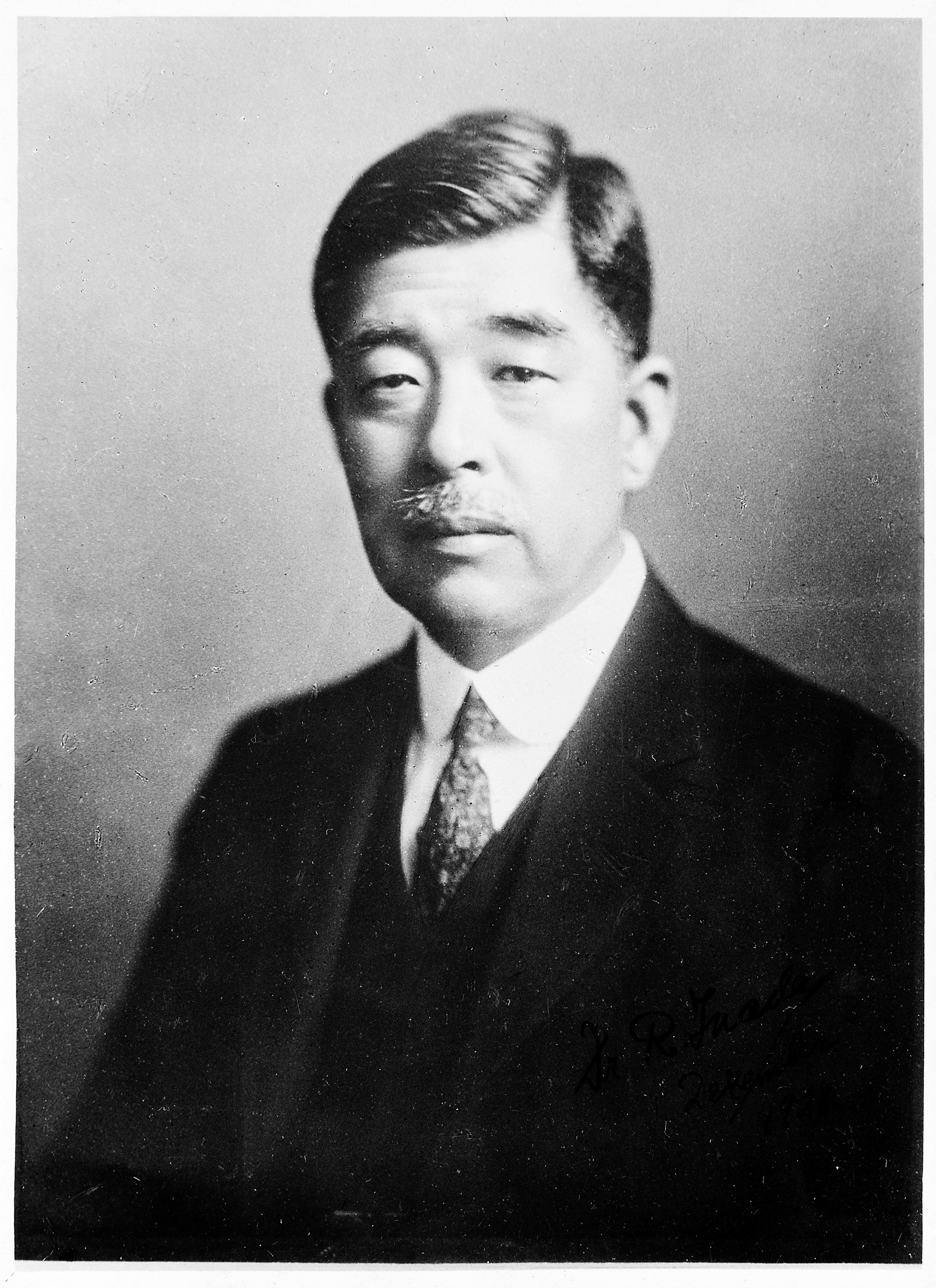
- Born: March 18, 1874; Nagoya, Japan
- Died: February 27, 1950 (aged 75)
- Education: Tokyo Imperial University
- Awards: Order of Culture
- Scientific career
- Fields: Bacteriology
- Workplaces: Fukuoka Medical College; Tokyo University

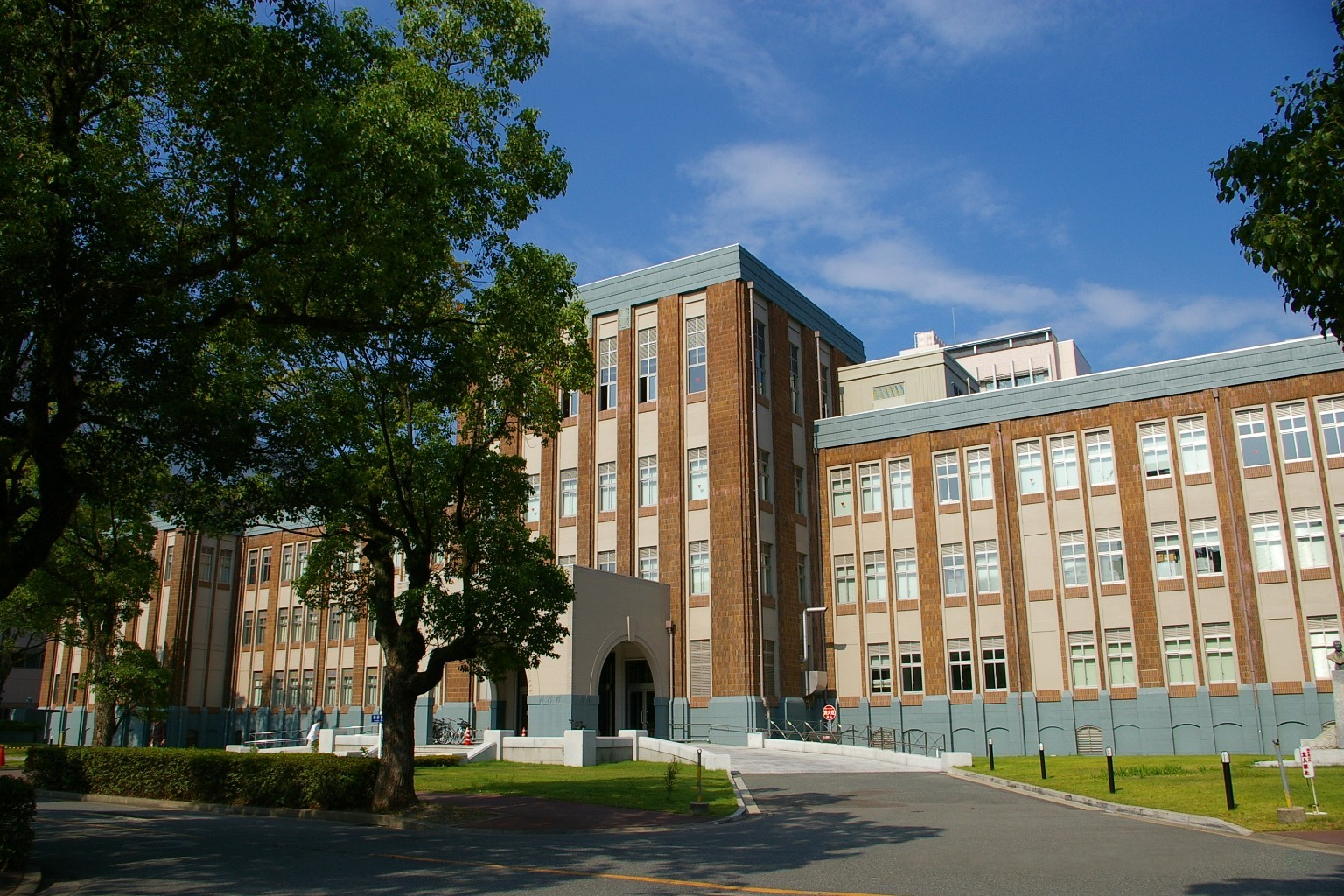
Faculty of Medicine Bldg. A of Basic Science (Kyushu University)

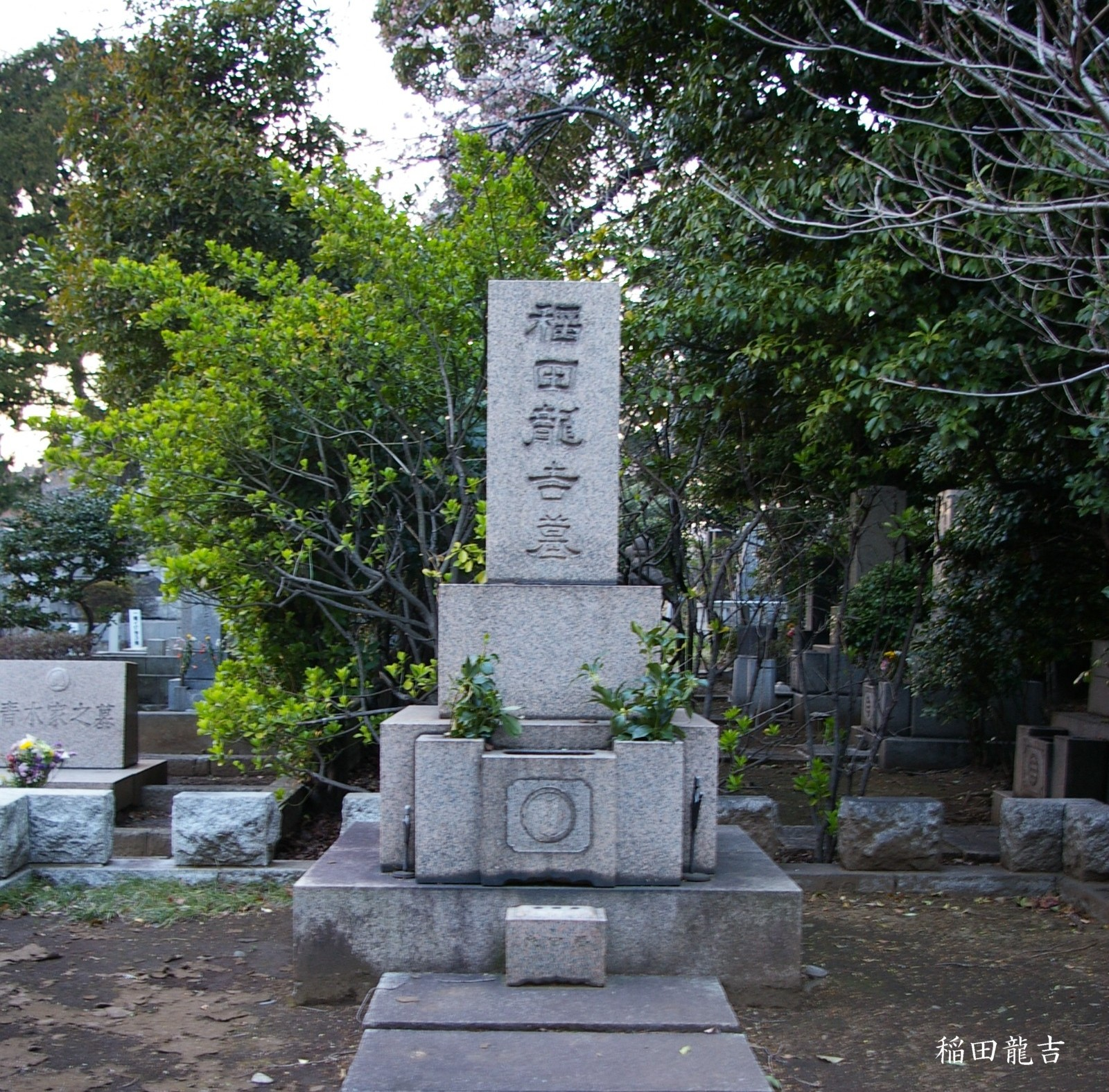
Grave of Dr.Inada Ryukichi in Japan.

Ryukichi Inada (稲田 龍吉, Inada Ryūkichi; March 18, 1874 – February 27, 1950) was a Japanese physician, prominent academic, and bacteriologist researcher. He discovered the Weil's disease pathogen. In addition to his life's work in early 20th-century Japanese medical education, he was a pioneer in Japanese clinical cardiology and oncology.

== Early life ==
Inada was born in Nagoya and graduated from Tokyo Imperial University in medicine before travelling abroad for medical studies in Germany.

== Career ==
Returning to Japan from Europe, Inada became the first professor of medicine at Fukuoka Medical College (福岡医科大学, Fukuoka Ika Daigaku) of the Kyoto Imperial University (京都帝国大学, Kyōto Teikoku Daigaku), now Kyushu University, School of Medicine.

In 1914–1915, Inada discovered the spirochete bacteria that causes infectious jaundice (Weil's disease) and developed a successful antiserum treatment for the infection. He is credited with ground-breaking research on the Weil's disease pathogen, Leptospira. The initial specimen material (stock of Ictero No.1) which Dr. Inada isolated in 1914 has been preserved as a significant artifact in the history of medicine. In 1915, Inaba described the pathogen in a series of papers titled "Hemorrhagic Icterus 'Spirochaete' Disease" (日本黄疸出血性「スピロヘータ」病, Nihon ōdan shukketsu-sei supirohēta byō) covering content ranging from the discovery of the pathogen, to contagion sources, clinical medicine, pathology, diagnosis, and cure.

Professor Inada was the first in Japan to import an electrocardiograph and, along with medical school colleagues, was amongst the first to use this device clinically in Japan. He was a prominent Japanese oncologist as well, serving as Vice President of the Japanese Society of Oncological Research from 1919 until his death in 1950.

In 1920 he was installed as professor of medicine at the medical school of Tokyo University (Tōkyō daigaku igakubu). In 1928, he reported the first cases of ulcerative colitis in Japan, ten cases collated over ten years. In 1943, he was named the President of the Japanese Medical Association and the President of the Japan Medical Treatment Corporation. In 1919, Inada and his co-worker Yutaka Ido were nominated by Louis Martin of Pasteur Institute, Paris for the Nobel Prize in Medicine for their 1915 discovery.

== Honors ==
He was awarded the Order of Culture (文化勲章, Bunka kunshō).

The Maidashi campus of Kyushu University has commemorated Dr. Inada's contributions to the institution by naming one of the campus streets Inada dōri.

== Gallery ==
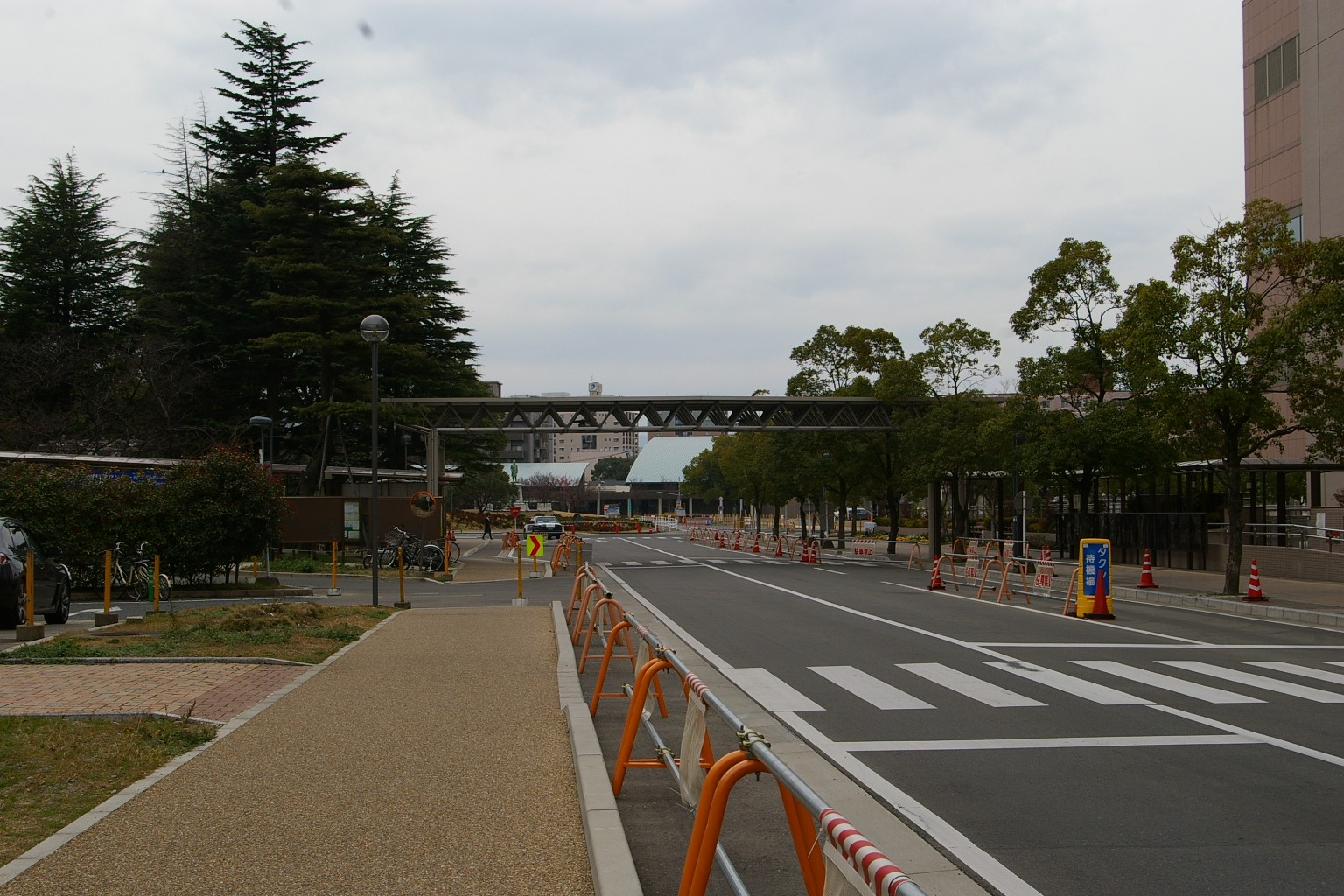
Inada dōri

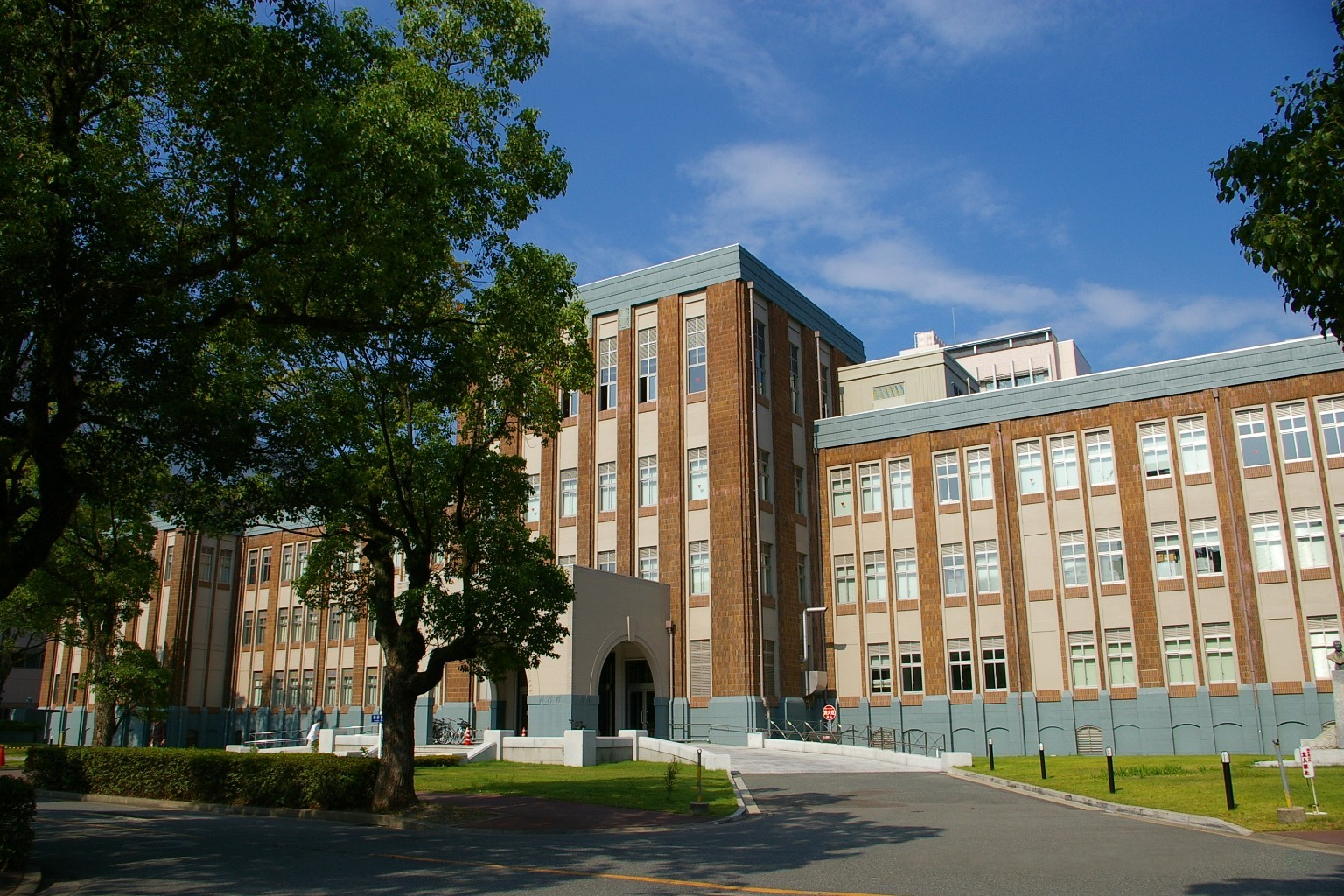
Kyushu Imperial University internal medicine laboratory

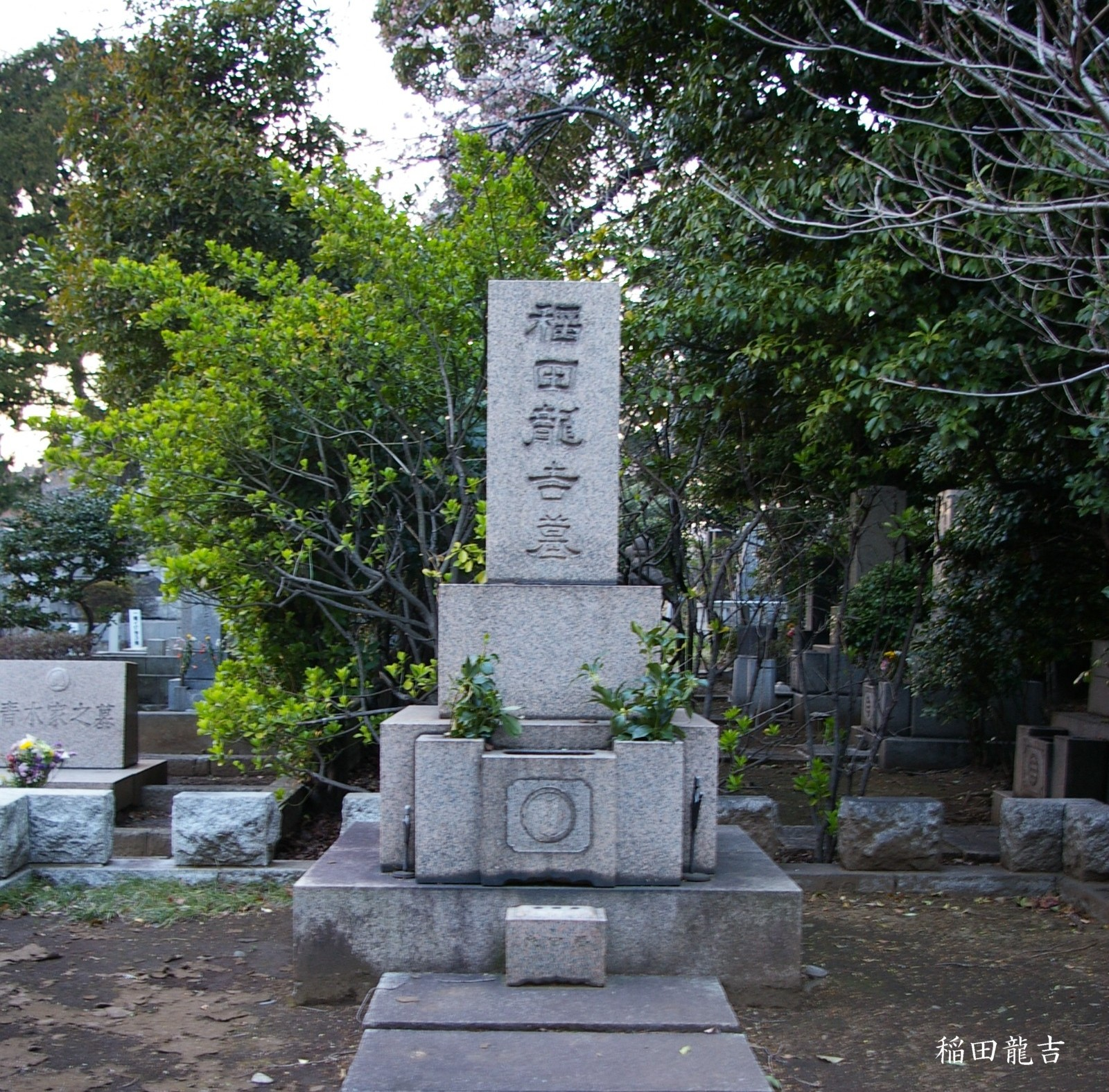
grave
