= Leo Esaki =

Japanese physicist (born 1925)

- 江崎 玲於奈
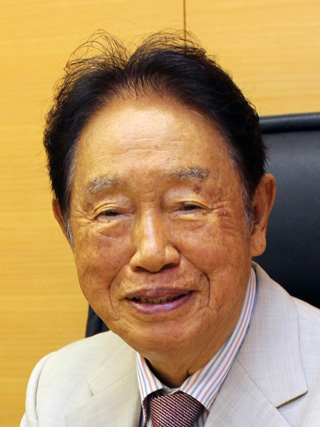
- Esaki in 2020
- Born: March 12, 1925 (age 101); Osaka, Japan
- Education: University of Tokyo: B.S., Physics; Ph.D., Physics
- Known for: Tunneling in semiconductors; Tunnel diode; Superlattices; Quantum wells
- Children: Anna Esaki
- Relatives: Craig S. Smith (son-in-law)
- Awards: Nishina Memorial Prize (1959); Morris Liebmann Memorial Prize (1961); Stuart Ballantine Medal (1961); Nobel Prize in Physics (1973); International Prize for New Materials (1985); Harold Pender Award (1989); IEEE Medal of Honor (1991); Japan Prize (1998)
- Scientific career
- Fields: Physics
- Workplaces: Tokyo Tsushin Kogyo; Thomas J. Watson Research Center
- Thesis: 薄いp-n接合における新現象 (1959)

Leo Esaki (江崎 玲於奈, Esaki Reona; born March 12, 1925) is a Japanese physicist who shared the 1973 Nobel Prize in Physics with Ivar Giaever and Brian Josephson for his work on tunneling in semiconductors, which led to his invention of the tunnel diode that exploits this phenomenon. His research was done when he was with Sony. He has also contributed in being a pioneer of semiconductor superlattices.

Since the death of Yoichiro Nambu in 2015, Esaki is the oldest living Japanese Nobel laureate.

== Biography ==
Leo Esaki was born on March 12, 1925, in Osaka, Japan. Esaki studied physics at the University of Tokyo, where he received a Bachelor of Science in 1947 and a Doctor of Philosophy in 1959. In 1947, he joined the Kobe Kogyo Corporation, before becoming chief physicist at Tokyo Tsushin Kogyo (now Sony) in 1956.

In 1960, Esaki moved to the United States to join IBM's Thomas J. Watson Research Center, where he was appointed an IBM Fellow in 1967. In 1992, he returned to Japan, where he subsequently served as President of the University of Tsukuba until 1998.

== Research ==
=== Tunneling ===
In 1957, Esaki recognized that when the p–n junction width of germanium is thinned, the current–voltage characteristic is dominated by the influence of the tunnel effect. As a result, he discovered that as the voltage is increased, the current decreases inversely, indicating negative resistance. This discovery was the first demonstration of solid tunneling effects in physics, and it was the birth of the first quantum electronic device, the tunnel diode.

=== Superlattices ===
In 1969, Esaki predicted that semiconductor superlattices will be formed to induce a differential negative-resistance effect via an artificially one-dimensional periodic structural changes in semiconductor crystals. His unique "molecular-beam epitaxy" thin-film crystal growth method can be regulated quite precisely in ultrahigh vacuum. A 1987 comment by Esaki regarding the original paper notes:

"The original version of the paper was rejected for publication by Physical Review on the referee's unimaginative assertion that it was 'too speculative' and involved 'no new physics.' However, this proposal was quickly accepted by the Army Research Office..."

In 1972, Esaki realized his concept of superlattices in III-V group semiconductors. Later, this concept influenced many fields like metals and magnetic materials.

== Family ==
Esaki's daughter, Anna Esaki, is married to Craig S. Smith, former Shanghai bureau chief of The New York Times and China bureau chief of The Wall Street Journal.

== Esaki's "five don'ts" rules ==
At the 1994 Lindau Nobel Laureate Meetings, Esaki suggested a list of "five don'ts" which anyone in realizing their creative potential should follow. Two months later, the chairman of the Nobel Committee for Physics Carl Nordling incorporated the rules in his own speech.

1. Don't allow yourself to be trapped by your past experiences.
2. Don't allow yourself to become overly attached to any one authority in your field – the great professor, perhaps.
3. Don't hold on to what you don't need.
4. Don't avoid confrontation.
5. Don't forget your spirit of childhood curiosity.

== Recognition ==
=== Awards ===
Year	Organization	Award	Co-recipients	Citation	Ref.
1959	Nishina Memorial Foundation	Nishina Memorial Prize	—	"[For the] invention of the Esaki diode."	
1961	Institute of Radio Engineers	Morris Liebmann Memorial Prize	—	"For important contributions to the theory and technology of solid state devices, particularly as embodied in the tunnel diode."	
1961	Franklin Institute	Stuart Ballantine Medal	—	"For the development of the tunnel diode and the discovery and utilization of quantum-mechanical tunneling in semiconductors."	
1973	Royal Swedish Academy of Sciences	Nobel Prize in Physics	Ivar Giaever and Brian Josephson	"For their experimental discoveries regarding tunneling phenomena in semiconductors and superconductors, respectively."	
1985	American Physical Society	International Prize for New Materials	Leroy Chang and Raphael Tsu	"For his conception of artificial semiconductor superlattices and his recognition that such structures have realizable and would have novel electronic properties. His sustained experimental and theoretical efforts have helped lead the way to versatile new materials and technologies."	
1989	University of Pennsylvania	Harold Pender Award	—	—	
1991	Institute of Electrical and Electronics Engineers	IEEE Medal of Honor	—	"For contributions to and leadership in tunneling, semiconductor superlattices, and quantum wells."	
1998	Japan Prize Foundation	Japan Prize	—	"For the creation and realization of the concept of man-made superlattice crystals which lead to generation of new materials with useful applications."	

=== Memberships ===
Year	Organization	Type	Ref.
1960	American Physical Society	Fellow	
1974	American Academy of Arts and Sciences	Member	
1975	Japan Academy	Member	
1976	National Academy of Sciences	International Member	
1977	National Academy of Engineering	International Member	
1991	American Philosophical Society	Member	

=== Honorary degrees ===
Year	University	Degree	Ref.
2001	Hong Kong University of Science and Technology	Doctor of Science	

== Commemoration ==
In recognition of three Nobel laureates' contributions, the bronze statues of Shin'ichirō Tomonaga, Leo Esaki, and Makoto Kobayashi were set up in the Central Park of Azuma 2 in Tsukuba in 2015.

== See also ==
- Resonant-tunneling diode
- List of Japanese Nobel laureates
- List of Nobel laureates affiliated with the University of Tokyo
