= COVID-19 cases at the 2020 Summer Olympics and 2020 Summer Paralympics =

Cases of COVID-19 at the 2020 Summer Olympics and the 2020 Summer Paralympics
- Disease: COVID-19
- Pathogen: SARS-CoV-2
- Location: Harumi Olympic Village, Tokyo, Japan
- First outbreak: Wuhan, Hubei, China
- First reported: 2 July 2021
- Index case: 2 July 2021
- Arrival date: 2 July 2021; 5 years ago
- Confirmed cases: 788
- Hospitalized cases: 3
- Deaths: 0

Government website
- COVID-19 Positive Case List

Cases of COVID-19 at the 2020 Summer Olympics and the 2020 Summer Paralympics in Tokyo, Japan, are part of a cluster of SARS-CoV-2 infections within the COVID-19 pandemic in Tokyo that began in the Tokyo 2020 Olympic Village in July 2021, prior to the Opening Ceremony of the 2020 Summer Olympics on 23 July 2021. The Olympics ended on 8 August 2021 before the Opening Ceremony of the 2020 Summer Paralympics started on 24 August 2021. The Paralympics ended on 5 September 2021 before the 2022 Winter Olympics in Beijing, China started a few months later.

There have been 788 cases detected and reported by the Tokyo 2020 Organising Committee between 1 July and 8 September 2021, with 66 additional cases being detected among Games personnel before that date after the Committee started recording them at an unknown date. The cases have sparked concerns prior to the games. The bubble surrounding the Olympic Village has been described as having been broken after the first case occurred there in mid-July.

== Background ==
On 7 September 2013, Tokyo was selected as the host city of the 2020 Summer Olympics, officially the Games of the XXXII Olympiad, during the 125th IOC Session in Buenos Aires, Argentina. It was elected over Istanbul and Madrid. The games are the fourth Olympic Games to be held in Japan following Tokyo 1964 (Summer), Sapporo 1972 (Winter), and Nagano 1998 (Winter) for the Olympics. For the Paralympics, the games are the third to be held in Japan following Tokyo 1964 (Summer) and Nagano 1998 (Winter). Tokyo is the first city in Asia to host the Summer Games twice for the Olympics and Paralympics.

On 1 December 2019, the first known case of coronavirus disease 2019 (COVID-19), a novel virus caused by severe acute respiratory syndrome coronavirus 2 (SARS-CoV-2), was identified in Wuhan, China. The virus has since spread to other parts of mainland China and around the world, becoming the COVID-19 pandemic, one of the deadliest pandemics in history.

The virus first arrived in Japan on 16 January 2020, a man from Kanagawa Prefecture tested positive for the virus. Concerns were raised about the potential impact of the pandemic on athletes and visitors to the Olympic Games. In February 2020, Tokyo 2020 organizers insisted that the games would not be postponed or cancelled. They insisted that they were closely monitoring the spread of the disease. The IOC stated that their Japanese partners and then-prime minister Shinzo Abe "made it very clear that Japan could not manage a postponement beyond next summer [2021] at the latest".

On 24 March 2020, the games, which were originally scheduled to take place from 24 July to 9 August 2020, were postponed due to the pandemic. Six days later, it was announced the games have been rescheduled to 23 July to 8 August 2021 and still branded with the Tokyo 2020 name for marketing and branding purposes. This is the first time that the Olympic Games have been postponed and rescheduled, rather than cancelled.

On 23 July 2020, one year ahead to the rescheduled opening ceremony, a promotional video featured swimmer Rikako Ikee carrying the lantern inside the empty Japan National Stadium giving a message about the pandemic and an impact of the athletes, and planning to return onto the sport after being diagnosed with leukemia.

On 20 June 2021, a few weeks before the first official case of COVID-19 was declared, a member of Ugandan Olympic delegation tested positive for the virus upon arrival in Japan.

Cases of COVID-19 at the 2020 Summer Olympics and the 2020 Summer Paralympics in Tokyo, Japan, are part of a cluster of SARS-CoV-2 infections within the COVID-19 pandemic in Japan caused by severe acute respiratory syndrome coronavirus 2 (SARS-CoV-2). As a result of the threat of the virus, this restricts family members and friends of the athletes, many events are being held without spectators in attendance as a precautionary measure to combat the disease and a state of emergency imposed in the Greater Tokyo Area on 8 July 2021. All Olympic and Paralympic COVID cases were counted under Japan's COVID case toll than the person's home country's toll.

== Timeline of positive cases ==
View source data.
Daily positive cases reported by the Tokyo Organizing Committee.

The first cases were reported on 2 July when the Tokyo Organising Committee announced that two Japanese citizens working for the Olympics had been tested positive. The first case of an athlete tested positive was reported on 15 July. Three South African footballers in the South African men's national football team tested positive days before the opening ceremony. Ryu Seung-min, a former Olympic athlete and International Olympic Committee member from South Korea tested positive for the coronavirus on landing in Tokyo on 18 July. An American gymnast and a Czech beach volleyball player tested positive on 20 July.

List of positive cases reported by the Tokyo Organizing Committee on and after July 1
Date	Athlete	Staff (Note: Including media, contractors, and employees.)	Volunteer	Total
July 1	0	0	0	0
July 2	0	2	0	2
July 3	0	0	0	0
July 4	0	0	0	0
July 5	0	7	0	7
July 6	0	3	0	3
July 7	0	2	0	2
July 8	0	2	0	2
July 9	0	1	0	1
July 10	0	1	0	1
July 11	0	0	0	0
July 12	0	0	0	0
July 13	0	0	0	0
July 14	0	2	0	2
July 15	1	5	0	6
July 16	0	4	0	4
July 17	0	15	0	15
July 18	3	7	0	10
July 19	0	3	0	3
July 20	1	7	1	9
July 21	1	7	0	8
July 22	2	10	0	12
July 23	3	16	0	19
July 24	0	16	0	16
July 25	2	8	0	10
July 26	3	12	0	15
July 27	1	5	0	6
July 28	0	15	1	16
July 29	3	18	0	24
July 30	3	20	4	27
July 31	0	21	0	21
Aug 1	1	16	1	18
Aug 2	0	16	1	17
Aug 3	1	16	1	18
Aug 4	4	21	4	29
Aug 5	1	28	2	31
Aug 6	0	27	2	29
Aug 7	0	21	1	22
Aug 8	0	23	3	26
Aug 9	0	22	6	28
Aug 10	0	0	0	0
Aug 11	0	0	0	0
Aug 12	0	0	0	0
Aug 13	0	4	0	4
Aug 14	0	12	0	12
Aug 15	0	8	0	8
Aug 16	0	7	0	7
Aug 17	0	9	0	9
Aug 18	0	17	1	18
Aug 19	0	16	0	16
Aug 20	1	11	0	12
Aug 21	1	14	0	19
Aug 22	2	27	1	30
Aug 23	1	11	0	12
Aug 24	1	9	0	10
Aug 25	2	14	0	16
Aug 26	2	13	0	15
Aug 27	0	13	0	13
Aug 28	0	19	3	22
Aug 29	2	9	0	11
Aug 30	1	9	1	11
Aug 31	2	14	0	16
Sept 1	0	6	1	7
Sept 2	0	11	2	13
Sept 3	0	10	2	12
Sept 4	0	10	0	10
Sept 5	0	4	0	4
Sept 6	0	6	0	6
Sept 7	0	6	0	6
Sept 8	0	4	0	4
Total	46	704	38	788

== Impact ==
North Korea and a number of other sportspeople eligible for the 2020 Summer Olympics and 2020 Summer Paralympics in Tokyo stated that they would not attend because of concerns relating to the ongoing COVID-19 pandemic and the situation with respect to the COVID-19 pandemic in Japan. The New Zealand Paralympic team did not attend the opening ceremony of the Paralympics for safety reasons.

== See also ==
- List of athletes not attending the 2020 Summer Olympics due to COVID-19 concerns
- List of athletes not attending the 2020 Summer Paralympics due to COVID-19 concerns
- Concerns and controversies at the 2020 Summer Olympics
- COVID-19 cases at the 2022 Winter Olympics and 2022 Winter Paralympics
