= Novel Coronavirus Expert Meeting =

Japanese advisory body

Novel Coronavirus Expert Meeting (新型コロナウイルス感染症対策専門家会議, Shingata Korona Uirusu Kansenshō Taisaku Senmonka Kaigi) is a Japanese advisory body established in the New Coronavirus Infectious Diseases Control Headquarters of the Japanese Cabinet.

== Background ==
It was established on 14 February to advise the Cabinet of Japan from a medical point of view, following the first confirmed COVID-19 death in Japan.

Takaji Wakita, Director of the National Institute of Infectious Diseases, chairs the Expert Meeting and Shigeru Omi who was instrumental in SARS measures as director of WHO Regional Office for the Western Pacific and later worked to respond to the 2009 swine flu pandemic in Japan is a vice chairman. The members are composed of Prof. Hitoshi Oshitani, who is the leader of the Cluster Measures Team and remedied the situation in the SARS outbreak as an infectious disease advisor at WHO Regional Office for the Western Pacific, and others.

== Dissolution ==
At a press conference on June 24, Yasuhiro Nishimura, Minister for Economic and Fiscal Policy, announced that the Expert Meeting would be abolished and replaced by a new subcommittee of infectious disease experts under The Advisory Council on Countermeasures against Novel Influenza and Other Diseases. According to Minister Nishimura, the decision to dissolve the Expert Meeting was because "it was not based on the law and its position was unstable". The announcement appeared to come as a surprise, and Vice Chairman Shigeru Omi, who was present, was visibly unable to conceal his confusion. On July 3, The Novel Coronavirus Infectious Disease Control Subcommittee was officially established under the Novel Coronavirus Special Measures Act. The members consisted of infectious disease specialists as well as local representatives, trade union executives, economists, risk communication specialists and other experts. Shigeru Omi serves as chairman.

== Japan's Strategy for COVID-19 ==
The aim of the Expert Meeting is to curb the pandemic while maintaining socio-economic activities. If countries around the world repeatedly block the city and lift the blockade every time an outbreak occurs, the global economy and society will collapse. They think that urban blockade is a 19th-century measure, and that there is a 21st-century-type measure to curb the spread of infection by controlling the behavior of people.

Vaccine development takes time, and we don't know if we can actually make a vaccine. Herd immunity cannot be achieved unless a large number of victims are killed and about 70% of the population is infected.

There were three pillars of basic strategy that they chose. (1) Early "cluster crushing" by investigation of mass infection. (2) "Preventing aggravation" by strengthening the medical system. (3) "Changing people's behavior" to prevent the spread of infection.

=== Three C's ===
The Expert Meeting analyzed the outbreak from Wuhan, which became the first wave of COVID-19 in Japan, and discovered the conditions under which clusters occur, "Three C's (3つの密, Mittsu no Mitsu)". They concluded that most of the primary cases that touched off large clusters were either asymptomatic or had very mild symptoms, and thought it is impossible to stop the emergence of clusters just by testing many people. The first strategy they hammered out was to avoid places of "Three C's (Closed spaces, Crowded spaces and Close-contact settings)." The main routes of infection were considered to be "contact infection", which is transmitted by touching a substance to which the virus is attached, and "droplet infection", which is transmitted by inhaling droplets from a sneeze or cough. However, it has been pointed out that the possibility of "micro droplet infection" is pointed out as a new infection route. A small particle of less than 10 micrometers in diameter containing the virus, a micro-spray floats in the air for 20 minutes, and the infection spreads by people nearby sucking it in.

=== Cluster surveillance ===
One of the features of the measures for the new coronavirus in Japan is the strategy of cluster surveillance. Japan has deterred outbreaks through epidemiological surveys centered on cluster surveillance.

In early February, Oshitani and Hiroshi Nishiura, a members of the Cluster Measures Team, found that 80% of patients did not infect others with the coronavirus, but certain patients infected many people, by analyzing the data of the first wave from China. The Expert Meeting set their eyes on that, they decided to prevent outbreaks by tracking infected people and testing those who were in close contact with them. 80% of these infected don't infect anyone with the new coronavirus, so we don't need to find all the infected. If we can find a cluster, we can control this disease to some extent.

If the number of positives is small, it is possible to suppress the spread of infection by tracking the cluster, and it is possible to continue the infectious disease measures while maintaining a constant economic activity.

When the infection rate is very low, the infection will not spread by testing only high-risk people. PCR tests cause false positives, so many tests at low infection rates can even cause false positives to outnumber true positives. They took that strategy with that in mind.

Behind that was that the medical resources in Japan were vulnerable. Unlike other Asian countries, Japan was not well prepared to test for infectious diseases because SARS did not land. The new coronavirus became a designated infectious disease, so those who tested positive were required to be hospitalized even for mild cases, and there were few sickbeds.

However, they also thought that it was a big problem that the number of PCR tests did not increase in the rapid increase of the infected person, and they have gradually increased the number of PCR tests since mid-March.

The strategy worked well until mid-March, and it succeeded in preventing the first wave from China, but the second wave via returnees from Europe and the US could not be stopped, and the outbreak occuared in April. That was revealed in May by a genomic molecular epidemiology survey of the new coronavirus (SARS-CoV-2).

=== Changing people's behavior ===
The outbreak occurred in April, and the government declared a "statement of emergency" and asked people to quarantine themselves. The Expert Meeting asked people to “reduce contact between people by 80% more than usual” in order to reduce the rate of increase in the number of infected people and allow cluster surveillance again. They doubted the 80% goal was achieved, but there was fairly extensive voluntary national compliance. Japan's mild "lockdown" seemed to have a real lockdown effect. When the government lifted the state of emergency in May, they then proposed "new lifestyle" for people.

== General overview ==
=== The 15th Meeting (29 May) ===
Taking lifting a state of emergency, they made an assessment at that point on their efforts. Japan achieved a certain amount of results in suppressing the increase in the number of infected people and reducing the number of deaths and serious injuries compared to Western countries. Four factors were cited: (1) the universal health insurance system, (2) high medical level, (3) public health centers in each region, (4) high public awareness of hygiene.

In addition, it was evaluated that "early detection of the spread of two waves of infection from China and Europe" and "cluster countermeasures" were effective. Generally, the media and others call the spread of infection in April as the first wave in Japan. However, the Expert Meeting called the wave from China the “first wave” and the wave from Europe and the US "the second wave." In stopping the two waves, accurately catching the epidemic has helped prevent the rapid spread of infection. The increase in the cumulative number of people infected between February 18 and February 25 confirmed that. At that time, the number of cases did not increase significantly in Germany, France, and the UK, etc., but it is possible that it advanced unnoticed. The spread of the infection actually occurred in western countries, but it may have progressed beneath the surface. It is conceivable that it might have led to a subsequent outbreak.

Cluster surveillance played an important role in capturing the spread of infection in Japan. Cluster surveillance using active epidemiological surveys, such as interviewing infected people, is also common abroad, but there is a big difference in the method between Japan and them. Japan has conducted two types of surveys: a "prospective contact tracing", which identifies close contacts with infected people starting with new cases, and "retrospective contact tracing", which identifies where new patients were infected and identifies close contacts together with them at their common source of infection. However, most countries have not carried out this "retroactive contact tracing" though some cases were confirmed in Taiwan. The Expert Meeting speculated that there might be a difference in their ultimate goals in the background. Other countries are aiming to contain this virus, but Japan is not aiming for it in the first place, and frequently announces that it is impossible. "Prospective contact tracking" is a basic strategy for cluster surveillance that is carried out when aiming for virus containment, and has a history of being used during SARS and Ebola. However, it was pointed out from the beginning in Japan that the containment of this new coronavirus is almost impossible. If only "prospective contact tracking" aimed at containment is performed, it is inevitable to overlook the spread of infection below the surface. It was fortunate that the public health centers in Japan have been conducting investigations of the source of infection along with the tracing close contacts with infected people from the beginning. The Expert Meeting said that they will continue to scrutinize why they were able to investigate the source of infection in Japan first, and then speculated that it might be due to the constant effort to find the source of tuberculosis.

When the reporters pointed out that the PCR tests for close contacts was insufficient, the Expert Meeting said, "There is a misunderstanding about the PCR tests. Even if they develop, not all cases can be found. The sensitivity of the test kit to asymptomatic people is not very high. No one knows when they're going to get infected, so we'll have to test everyone every day to confirm. Is that the right choice?, We need to consider." In response to the opinion that the low number of PCR tests delayed their response, the Expert Meeting said, "Even if close contact is missed to some extent, most of them do not infect anyone with the virus. Even if there are some misses, many chains will naturally disappear. By clarifying the locations of many clusters, we were able to identify areas where infection was likely to occur, such as "3C's," and sent a message to avoid such an environment." However, The Expert Meeting also admitted that the number of tests was not sufficient at the time when the number of cases increased in April, and called on the country and each prefecture to develop the system.

The Expert Meeting gave a tentative assessment of the effect of the government's declaration of emergency on 7 April, but pointed out that the peak of the actual infection was around 1 April, before the declaration, and had already been on a downward trend due to a curfew announced by the Governor of Tokyo.

The Expert Meeting showed the recognition that it is important to prevent the spread of infection and the severity of the patient by providing early diagnosis and early medical care for infected people. The Expert Meeting said the re-emergence of the spread of infection of latent cases could have already occurred in some areas of Japan, and that it is important to being cautious about and being on the watch for that while continuing socio-economic activity. The Expert Meeting listed three initiatives for that purpose: (1) enabling early diagnosis of infected people by rapid tests such as antigen tests, (2) elucidating initial symptoms and narrowing down the test targets, (3) conducting research to find signs of progression of a patient's condition from subclinical to moderate.

== Criticism ==
The Expert Meeting and the Abe Cabinet have been exposed to harsh criticism by the Japanese media and their pundits.

Under that influence, Japanese people also cast a stern eye toward the Abe Cabinet. According to a public‐opinion poll by Asahi Shimbun and Mainichi Shimbun in May, the cabinet approval rating has dropped to its lowest level since its inception.

The Expert Meeting was also subject to criticism. Some people held them accountable for the delay in the measures, the lack of PCR tests, and other factors. In question-and-answer sessions at the Upper House Budget Committee, Omi, the deputy chairman, was criticized for the small number of PCR tests and was blamed by Tetsuro Fukuyama, secretary general of the Constitutional Democratic Party of JapanTY for stating that no one knew the actual total number of people infected. The Expert Meeting was blamed by opposition parties and the media for not fulfilling their responsibilities as scientists for not recording minutes. Wakita pointed out that they had sent out as much information as possible through proposals and press conferences, and that it was up to the government to take minutes. Omi said that they had proposed to the government to take minutes.

Not only in Japan but also abroad, especially in the US, UK and China, have criticized them.

There has been a flood of criticism from both home and abroad about the Expert Meeting and the government's response to the Diamond Princess.

The U.S. and Chinese media developed The Olympics Conspiracy Theory, claiming that the Abe Cabinet took part in the plot to make the number of infected people appear less than the actual number until just before the decision to postpone the Olympics. ABC-TV quoted a Japanese professor Koichi Nakano's contribution as a side note, and wondered, "Why did the number of infected people suddenly increase in Japan as soon as it was postponed?" That was later judged to be fake news by fact-checking in several media.

The small number of PCR tests in Japan has been questioned worldwide. CNN, an American pay TV channel, cited interviews with medical personnel Kenji Shibuya and Masahiro Kami, as well as political scientist Koichi Nakano and Japanese Communist Party Rep. Tomoko Tamura, and said that the number of infected people announced by the Japanese government is an undercount and that more tests will need to be actively conducted to accurately grasp the actual situation. The Communist Party's newspaper, Shimbun Akahata, said that Japan has too few tests compared to other countries, and that it is imperative to expand PCR tests. In Japan, there was even a conspiracy theory that the Expert Meeting had deliberately failed to carry out PCR tests in collusion with the Abe cabinet, and that the National Institute of Infectious Diseases (to which the chair belongs) hindered the expansion of PCR testing in an attempt to monopolize the data. On the other hand, many infectious disease specialists and clinicians who were familiar with EBM complained about easy expansion of PCR tests through SNS.

Regarding those criticisms, the Expert Meeting said that although the PCR test may produce false positives and false negatives, it is the only test method that can give a definitive diagnosis at the present time, and it should be carried out appropriately when necessary, but it also said that it was not effective to test every person. The Expert Meeting argued that there were no outbreaks in Japan, so few people were missed because of the small number of tests. Deputy Chairman Omi said that Japan has conducted surveillance for pneumonia, so almost all cases of them undergo a CT scan, and most of those would do a PCR test, and that in some cases, those who died at home or died in the streets tested positive after their death, but their system has picked up the right numbers of deaths. Omi argued that testing a large number of asymptomatic people who were worried would cause collapse of the medical care system.

Kenji Shibuya, a senior adviser to Tedros Adhanom and a professor at King's College London in the UK, severely criticizes the Expert Meeting that Japan couldn't expand the PCR tests because of their old way of thinking about classifying "returnees" and "contacts." Shibuya criticized the Expert Meeting as not independent of the government. Shibuya was concerned that Japan may have underestimated the number of people infected, as Japan had a low number of PCR tests and selected samples with a high probability of infection in interviews with CNN and the New York Times. Shibuya advocates that PCR tests should be carried out to all the people of the country. Shibuya is participating in a national movement that calls in the government to carry out a 100% PCR test for all citizens, which costs 54 trillion yen. Shibuya said he didn't think it would be valid for a nationwide school closure at the end of February. Using the data from the Institute of Infectious Diseases, Shibuya said, "I can't say with 100% certainty, but I can see that there was an excess mortality caused by another infection, the new coronavirus, in February." Shibuya said that the infection status of Japan, which can be read from the data released by the government and Tokyo, was insufficient, and lacked important informations on epidemiology. Shibuya criticized the timing of the state of emergency as being a week late. Shibuya predicted that Japan would have to lock down and lifting repeatedly, as the number of seriously ill patients and deaths would increase after June in Japan.

Masahiro Kami, the executive director of Japan's Medical Governance Research Institute, and an outside director of SBI Pharma Co., Ltd. and SBI Biotech Co., Ltd., complained that the new coronavirus measures should be reviewed from the beginning. Kami said, "The low number of infected people in Japan is due to the limited number of PCR tests. It's safe to say that there were about a million hidden corona patients." He asserted that the reason why the number of tests did not increase was due to the fact that the National Institute of Infectious Diseases, a research institute of the Ministry of Health, Labour and Welfare controlled the tests. Kami concludes that Japan's unsuccessful measures against corona are due to the clinical neglect, research supremacy and confidentiality of Expert Meeting. He traced the roots of members' alma mater back to before WWII, and he accused them that they are an establishment type who inherited the DNA of the Japanese Imperial Army, and that what they were doing to patients was not a treatment but a human experimentation. He appealed that the only solution would be to renew the current system with personnel.

Koichi Nakano, a member of the citizens' group "Civic Union calling for the Abolition of the Japan-U.S. Security System and The Restoration of Constitutionalism" and a professor at Sophia University, contributed an article to New York Times entitled "Japan Can't Handle the Coronavirus. Can It Host the Olympics?" In that article, he denounced the Japanese government as incapable of responding to the new coronavirus.

Yōichi Masuzoe, a former Governor of Tokyo and a political commentator, criticized the prime minister, saying, "No one might call the person who entrusts the judgment to the Expert Meeting which made many mistakes, and the person who is a puppet of the medical association and the governors association to the prime minister of a country. Can't he hear the voices of the people?"

Hiroshi Mikitani, Chairman and CEO of Rakuten, criticized the weakness of the PCR test system on Twitter, and then tried to launch a PCR test kit for corporations from a company funded by Rakuten. The kit was not approved for medical use and could not be used for definitive diagnosis. He was blamed by the public and announced that he would postpone the sale.

Masayoshi Son, SoftBank Group CEO, proposed free distribution of PCR test kits for one million people, but he gave up mainly due to criticism from medical professionals. The objection to the plan was that the infection spread through the courier when sending the sample, and that it is difficult for non-medical specialists to push a cotton swab deep into a nose to collect a sample. In contrast, Alibaba Group co-founder and then-SoftBank Group director Jack Ma was being thanked for donating 500,000 test kits to the US and Russia. After that, Son provided an antibody test kit for medical institutions and the like free of charge.

== The composition of the Expert Meeting ==
The Expert Meeting is composed of experts in infectious diseases, public health and virology, and lawyer. The standing members are as follows. However, the chairman may request the attendance of other parties as necessary.

=== The chairman ===
- Takaji Wakita (Director, National Institute of Infectious Diseases)

=== The deputy chairman ===
- Shigeru Omi (Chairman of the Japan Community Health care Organization, and President of the Advisory Committee on the Basic Action Policy)

=== Members ===
- Satoshi Kamayachi (Executive Director, Japan Medical Association)
- Akihiko Kawana (Professor, Department of Medical Education, National Defense Medical College)
- Yoshihiro Kawaoka (Director, International Research Center for Infectious Diseases, The Institute of Medical Science, University of Tokyo)
- Kaori Muto (Professor, Institute of Medical Science, University of Tokyo)
- Hitomi Nakayama (Lawyer, Kasumigaseki-Sogo Law Office)
- Nobuhiko Okabe (Director, Kawasaki City Institute of Health and Safety)
- Hitoshi Oshitani (Professor, Graduate School of Medicine, Tohoku University)
- Motoi Suzuki (Director, Center for Infectious Disease Epidemiology, National Institute of Infectious Diseases)
- Kazuhiro Tateda (Professor, School of Medicine, Toho University)
- Masaki Yoshida (Professor, Jikei University School of Medicine)
