= COVID-19 cases at the 2022 Winter Olympics and 2022 Winter Paralympics =

Cases of COVID-19 at the 2022 Winter Olympics and the 2022 Winter Paralympics
- Disease: COVID-19
- Pathogen: SARS-CoV-2
- Location: Olympic Village, Beijing, China
- First outbreak: Wuhan, Hubei, China
- First reported: January 23, 2022
- Arrival date: January 23, 2022; 4 years ago
- Confirmed cases: 437
- Deaths: 0

Government website
- COVID-19 Positive Case List

Cases of COVID-19 at the 2022 Winter Olympics and the 2022 Winter Paralympics in Beijing, China, is a cluster of SARS-CoV-2 infections within the COVID-19 pandemic in mainland China that began in the Beijing 2022 Olympic Village in January 2022, prior to the Opening Ceremony of the games on 4 February 2022.

There were 437 total coronavirus cases detected and reported by the Beijing Organizing Committee for the 2022 Olympic and Paralympic Winter Games since 23 January 2022. All cases at the 2022 Olympics are counted towards China's COVID case count rather than the home country of the person.

There were 26 cases in the time period after the 2022 Winter Olympics, which includes the 2022 Winter Paralympics. In total, more than 2.5 million tests for COVID-19 were conducted.

== Background ==
On 31 July 2015, Beijing was selected as the host city of the 2022 Winter Olympics, officially the XXIV Olympic Winter Games, during the 128th IOC Session in Kuala Lumpur, Malaysia. It was elected over Almaty. The games were the second Olympic Games to be held in China following Beijing 2008 (Summer). As a result, Beijing was also the first city to host both the Summer and the Winter Games for the Olympics and Paralympics.

On 1 December 2019, the first known case of coronavirus disease 2019 (COVID-19), a novel virus caused by severe acute respiratory syndrome coronavirus 2 (SARS-CoV-2), was identified in Wuhan. The virus has since spread to other parts of the host country and around the world, becoming the COVID-19 pandemic, one of the deadliest pandemics in history.

During the 2020 Tokyo Summer Olympics, there were 464 COVID-19 cases linked to the games. Despite the strict COVID-19 containment efforts including bubbles and claims of being the safest sporting event, the Beijing Winter Olympics reported only 27 fewer cases than the similar scale event during the 2020 Tokyo Summer Olympics, which had less stringent COVID-19 containment measures.

== Timeline of positive cases ==
View source data.
Daily positive cases reported by the Beijing Organizing Committee.

The first case related to the 2022 Winter Olympics was reported on Sunday 23 January 2022. Out of the total 437 cases of COVID-19 linked to the 2022 Winter Olympics, 171 cases, including 68 athletes or team officials were among the COVID-19 protective bubble residents. The rest of the 266 cases were detected from airport testing of the games related arrivals.

List of positive cases reported by the Beijing Organizing Committee on and after January 23
Date	Athlete	Staff (Note: Including media, contractors, and employees.)	Volunteer	Total
January 23	0	72	0	0
February 4	0	0	9	0
Total	0	0	0	81

== See also ==
- List of athletes not attending the 2022 Winter Olympics due to COVID-19 concerns
- Concerns and controversies at the 2022 Winter Olympics
- COVID-19 cases at the 2020 Summer Olympics and 2020 Summer Paralympics
