= Oshitani =

Oshitani is a Japanese surname. Notable people with the surname include:

- Hitoshi Oshitani (born 1959), Japanese virologist and public health expert
- Yuki Oshitani (born 1989), Japanese football player
