= List of athletes not attending the 2020 Summer Paralympics due to COVID-19 concerns =

List of athletes

A number of sportspeople eligible for the 2020 Summer Paralympics in Tokyo stated that they would not attend because of the COVID-19 pandemic in Japan.

Four Pacific nations were unable to attend the games due to COVID-19 related travel restrictions in Australia, which would have required the athletes to quarantine there at their own cost, which the National Paralympic Committees were unable to afford.

== List ==
=== Qualified but withdrew due to COVID-19 concerns ===
Sport	Athlete	Nationality/Team	Ref
All sports	North Korean athletes	North Korea	
All sports	I-Kiribati athletes	Kiribati	
All sports	Samoan athletes	Samoa	
All sports	Tongan athletes	Tonga	
All sports	Vanuatuan athletes	Vanuatu	

=== Qualified but withdrew due to testing positive for COVID-19 ===
Sport	Athlete	Nationality/Team	Ref
Powerlifting	Achelle Guion	Philippines	
Swimming	Undisclosed	Belarus	
Wheelchair basketball	Undisclosed	Iran	
Athletics	Jeanette Aceveda	Philippines	
Taekwondo	Allain Ganapin	Philippines	

Other Paralympians tested positive for COVID-19 whose identities were not disclosed. A total of 13 athletes in Japan have reportedly tested positive for COVID-19.

== See also ==
- List of athletes not attending the 2020 Summer Olympics due to COVID-19 concerns
- List of athletes not attending the 2022 Winter Olympics due to COVID-19 concerns
