= List of athletes not attending the 2020 Summer Olympics due to COVID-19 concerns =

List of athletes

A number of sportspeople eligible for the 2020 Summer Olympics in Tokyo stated that they would not attend because of the COVID-19 pandemic in Japan. In the case of tennis, media speculated that some absentees were unenthusiastic about competing in any case and used COVID-19 as a convenient excuse.

== List ==
=== Qualified but withdrew due to postponement or COVID-19 concerns ===
Sport	Athlete	Nationality/Team	Ref
All sports	North Korean athletes	North Korea	
Artistic swimming	Rose Stackpole	Australia	
Basketball	Andrew Bogut	Australia	
Basketball	Liz Cambage	Australia	
Basketball	Ben Simmons	Australia	
Basketball	Bradley Beal	United States	
Cycling	Amy Cure	Australia	
Equestrianism	Eric Lamaze	Canada	
Golf	Emiliano Grillo	Argentina	
Handball	Yvette Broch	Netherlands	
Rugby sevens	Kenki Fukuoka	Japan	
Swimming	Pieter Timmers	Belgium	
Tennis	Federico Delbonis	Argentina	
Tennis	Guido Pella	Argentina	
Tennis	Nick Kyrgios	Australia	
Tennis	Dominic Thiem	Austria	
Tennis	Bianca Andreescu	Canada	
Tennis	Denis Shapovalov	Canada	
Tennis	Cristian Garín	Chile	
Tennis	Emil Ruusuvuori	Finland	
Tennis	Jannik Sinner	Italy	
Tennis	Ričardas Berankis	Lithuania	
Tennis	Casper Ruud	Norway	
Tennis	Irina-Camelia Begu	Romania	
Tennis	Sorana Cîrstea	Romania	
Tennis	Laslo Đere	Serbia	
Tennis	Filip Krajinović	Serbia	
Tennis	Dušan Lajović	Serbia	
Tennis	Lloyd Harris	South Africa	
Tennis	Roberto Bautista Agut	Spain	
Tennis	Sofia Kenin	United States	
Tennis	Sam Querrey	United States	
Tennis	Serena Williams	United States	
Weightlifting	All Samoan weightlifters	Samoa	

=== Qualified but withdrew due to testing positive for COVID-19 ===
Sport	Athlete	Nationality/Team	Ref
Artistic Swimming	5 Artistic swimmers	Greece	
Athletics	Rutger Koppelaar	Netherlands	
Athletics	Sam Kendricks	United States	
Athletics	Djamel Sejati	Algeria	
Athletics	Bilal Tabti	Algeria	
Athletics	Germán Chiaraviglio	Argentina	
Athletics	Andwuelle Wright	Trinidad and Tobago	
Athletics	Sparkle McKnight	Trinidad and Tobago	
Baseball	Héctor Velázquez	Mexico	
Baseball	Sammy Solís	Mexico	
Basketball	Katie Lou Samuelson	United States	
Beach Volleyball	Taylor Crabb	United States	
Beach Volleyball	Markéta Sluková	Czech Republic	
Beach Volleyball	Ondřej Perušič	Czech Republic	
Cycling	Simon Geschke	Germany	
Cycling	Michal Schlegel	Czech Republic	
Football	Kamohelo Mahlatsi	South Africa	
Football	James Monyane	South Africa	
Golf	Jon Rahm	Spain	
Golf	Bryson DeChambeau	United States	
Gymnastics	Kara Eaker	United States	
Judo	Jevgeņijs Borodavko	Latvia	
Karate	Anna Chernysheva	ROC	
Rowing	Finn Florijn	Netherlands	
Rowing	Bruno Rosetti	Italy	
Shooting	Amber Hill	Great Britain	
Skateboarding	Candy Jacobs	Netherlands	
Surfing	Frederico Morais	Portugal	
Swimming	Ilya Borodin	ROC	
Table Tennis	Pavel Širuček	Czech Republic	
Taekwondo	Fernanda Aguirre	Chile	
Taekwondo	Reshmie Oogink	Netherlands	
Tennis	Alex de Minaur	Australia	
Tennis	Dan Evans	Great Britain	
Tennis	Coco Gauff	United States	
Tennis	Johanna Konta	Great Britain	
Tennis	Jean-Julien Rojer	Netherlands	
Weightlifting	Walid Bidani	Algeria	

== See also ==
- List of athletes not attending the 2022 Winter Olympics due to COVID-19 concerns
- List of athletes not attending the 2020 Summer Paralympics due to COVID-19 concerns
- List of athletes not attending the 2016 Summer Olympics due to Zika virus concerns
