= List of athletes not attending the 2016 Summer Olympics due to Zika virus concerns =

A number of sportspeople eligible for the 2016 Summer Olympics in Rio de Janeiro stated that they would not attend because of the ongoing Zika virus epidemic in Brazil. In the case of golf and tennis, media speculated that some absentees were unenthusiastic about competing in any case and used Zika as a reason for withdrawal.

== Table ==
Sport	Athlete	Nat	Ref
Cycling	Tejay van Garderen	(United States)	
Golf	Jason Day	(Australia)	
Golf	Branden Grace	(South Africa)	
Golf	Dustin Johnson	(United States)	
Golf	Shane Lowry	(Republic of Ireland)	
Golf	Rory McIlroy	(Republic of Ireland) (Note: McIlroy is from Northern Ireland and eligible for both the Ireland and Great Britain teams; in 2014 he had opted for Ireland.)	
Golf	Marc Leishman	(Australia)	
Golf	Charl Schwartzel	(South Africa)	
Golf	Angelo Que	(Philippines)	
Golf	Vijay Singh	(Fiji)	
Golf	Jordan Spieth	(United States)	
Golf	Graeme McDowell	(Republic of Ireland)	
Tennis	Milos Raonic	(Canada)	
Tennis	Tomas Berdych	(Czech Republic)	
Tennis	Alexandr Dolgopolov	(Ukraine)	
Tennis	Bob & Mike Bryan	(United States)	
Tennis	Simona Halep	(Romania)	
Tennis	Karolína Plíšková	(Czech Republic)	

== See also ==
- List of athletes not attending the 2020 Summer Olympics due to COVID-19 concerns
- List of athletes not attending the 2022 Winter Olympics due to COVID-19 concerns
