= COVID-19 pandemic in Tokyo =

- COVID-19 pandemic by municipality in Tokyo as of March 2021 1,001+ 501-1,000 101-500 51-100 21-50 1-20 No confirmed cases

- Number of infected people per 100,000 population as of August 2021
- Disease: COVID-19
- Pathogen: SARS-CoV-2
- Location: Tokyo, Japan
- First outbreak: Wuhan, Hubei, China
- Arrival date: January 24, 2020
- Confirmed cases: 962,673
- Severe cases: 79
- Recovered: 791,674
- Deaths: 3,564

The first case relating to the COVID-19 pandemic in Tokyo, Japan, was confirmed on January 24, 2020, and on February 13, 2020, the first infection of a Tokyo resident was confirmed. On March 26, 2020, the Tokyo Metropolitan Government established the "Tokyo Novel Coronavirus Infectious Diseases Control Headquarters" based on the Act on Special Measures against New Influenza.

As of July 31, 2022, the highest daily number of infected people in Tokyo was confirmed on July 28, 2022, with 40,406 people.

== Outbreak ==
=== New Year's party on a houseboat ===
On February 14, 2020, multiple infected people were confirmed among attendees of the New Year's party of a private taxi union branch in Tokyo held on a yakatabune (houseboat) on January 18, 2023. Two of them were relatives of a male taxi driver in his 70s who was confirmed infected on February 13. A few days before the New Year's party, a yakatabune employee served a tourist from Wuhan.

=== Hospitals ===
==== Eiju General Hospital ====
On March 25, 2020, more than a dozen inpatients and nurses were found to be infected at Eiju General Hospital, the largest in Taitō, Tokyo. According to the Tokyo metropolitan government, this is the first case of a suspected group infection in a hospital. Mayor Yukio Hattori of Taito Ward established the Taito Ward Novel Coronavirus Infectious Diseases Control Council, which is composed of people involved in medical institutions. It announced that it would open in hospitals and wards. In addition, it is believed that this cluster may also have originated from houseboats.

As of May 9, 131 patients and 83 staff members (8 full-time doctors, 60 nurses/nursing assistants, clerks/technicians/contractors, etc.) were confirmed to be infected one after another. 15), a total of 214 infections and 42 deaths have been found.

==== Metropolitan Bokuto Hospital ====
At the Tokyo Metropolitan Bokutoh Hospital in Sumida, infection was confirmed in one patient and one outsourced staff member on April 9, 2020 (announced on the 14th), and by April 28, 13 patients, 27 staff members, and outsourced staff were infected. A total of 43 infections, including 3 staff members, and 4 deaths have been confirmed.

=== 2020 Summer Olympics and 2020 Summer Paralympics ===
There have been 788 cases detected and reported by the Tokyo 2020 Organising Committee between 1 July and 8 September 2021, with 66 additional cases being detected among Games personnel before that date after the Committee started recording them at an unknown date. The cases have sparked concerns prior to the games. The bubble surrounding the Olympic Village has been described as having been broken after the first case occurred there in mid-July. (Full article...)

== Government response ==
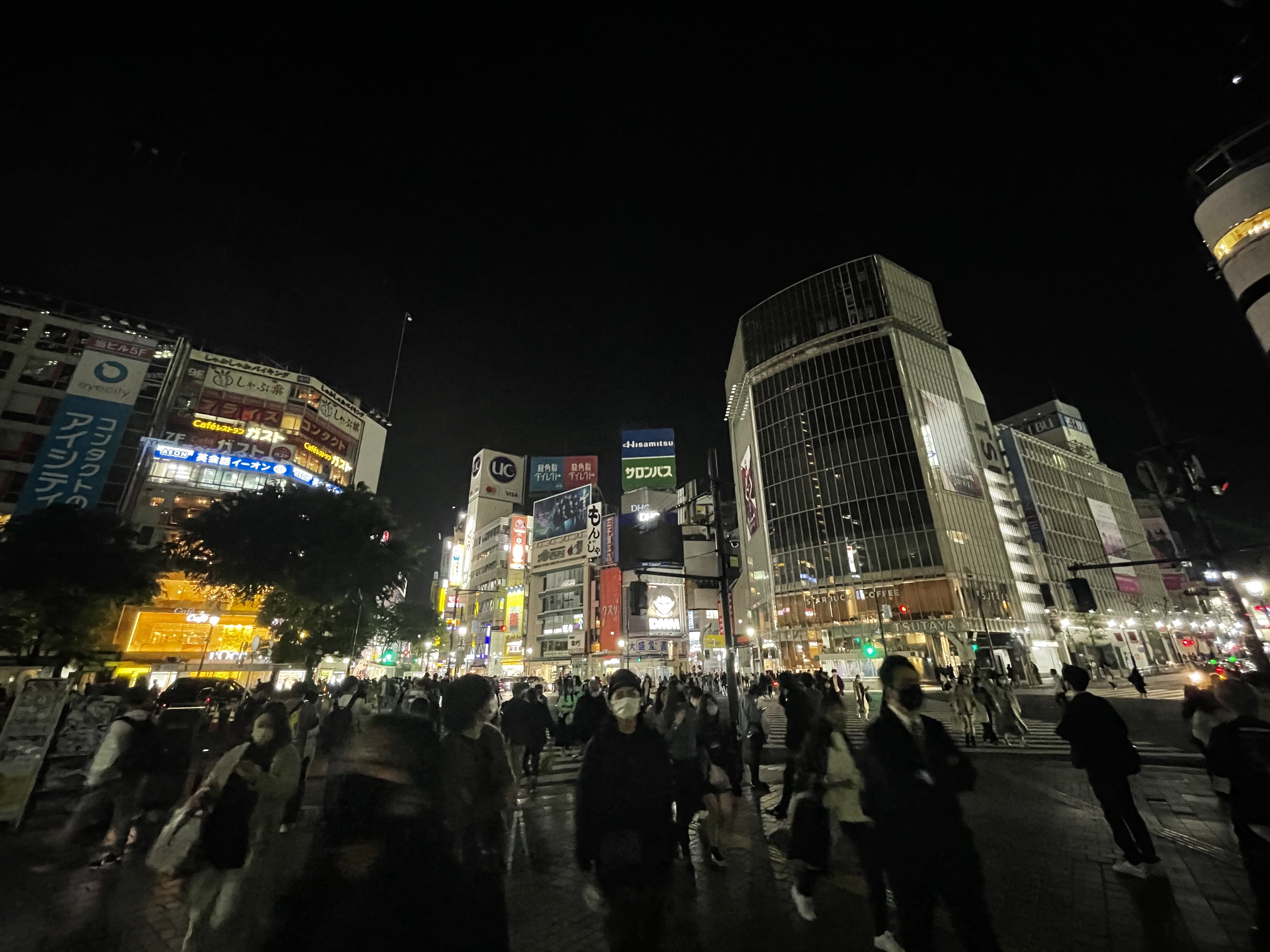
Shibuya Station, where the lights were turned off at the request of the Tokyo Metropolitan Government

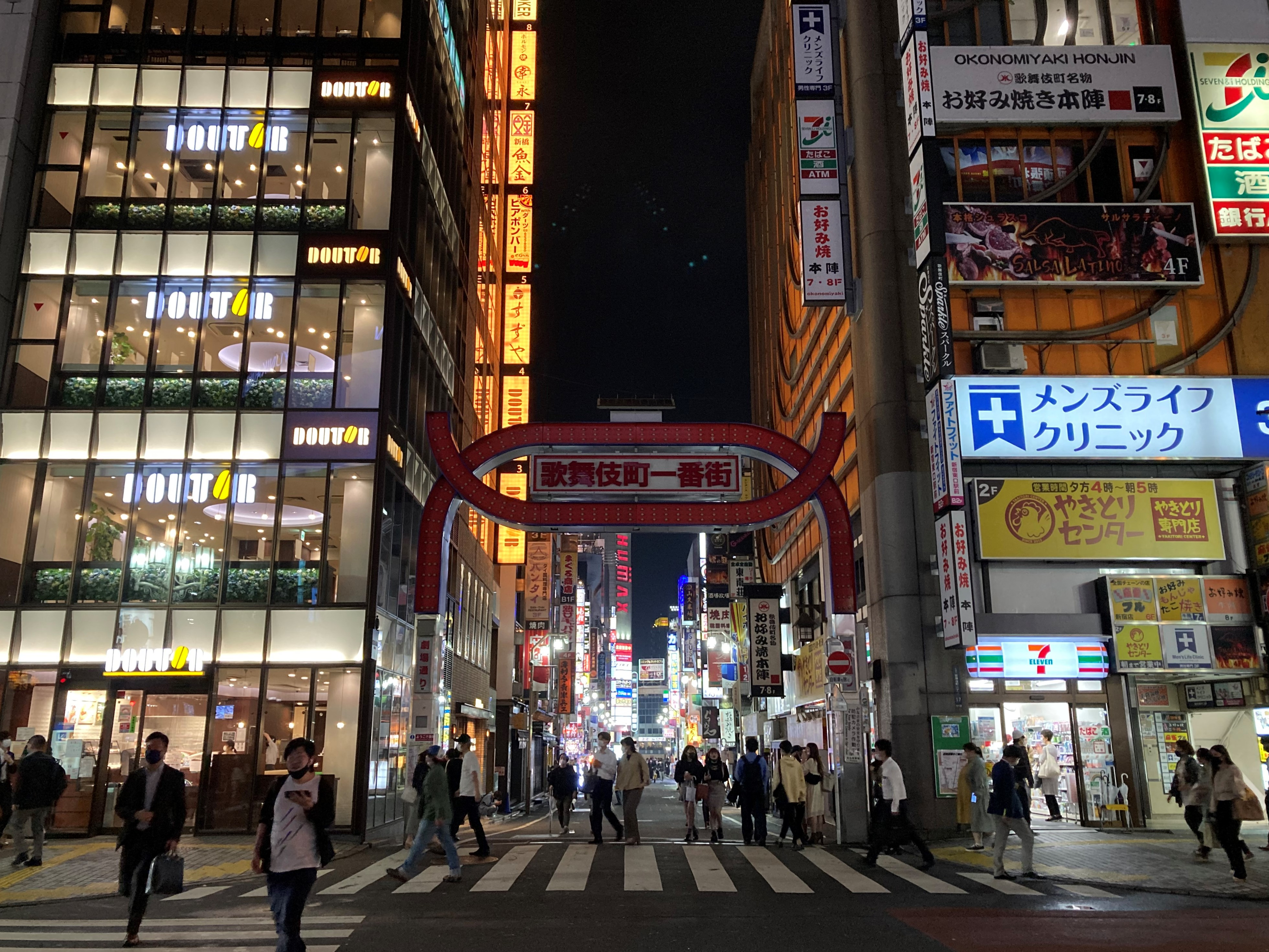
Kabukichō Ichiban-gai gate with neon lights off

- In June 2020, the Shinagawa Ward Office announced that it would provide all residents with 30,000 yen per person, and 50,000 yen for junior high school students and younger.
- On July 9, 2020, the Shinjuku Ward Office decided to pay 100,000 yen per person to residents who were confirmed to be infected, as some people were affected by the infection.
- On September 1, 2020, the Chiyoda Ward Assembly passed a supplementary budget bill that includes a new coronavirus countermeasure that provides all residents with 120,000 yen per person.
- On September 2, 2020, Tachikawa, as its own measure, decided to provide 10,000 yen per person as a living support and sympathy for citizens in the corona disaster.
- On January 7, 2021, the Tokyo Metropolitan Government opened restaurants, coffee shops, bars and karaoke shops.

=== Tokyo Alert ===
According to the Tokyo Metropolitan Government, Tokyo Alert was "an accurate notification of the infection situation in Tokyo and a call for vigilance". The purpose is to issue early warning information and prevent the re-expansion of infection. Tokyo Alert does not impose any restrictions on the lives of Tokyo residents, and is merely a call for vigilance by the city.

On 2 June 2020, Tokyo Alert was issued due to the risk of infection spreading mainly in downtown areas and hospitals at night. The Rainbow Bridge and the Tokyo Metropolitan Government Building were lit up in red. Journalist Toshinao Sasaki said in a radio program, "I wondered what Tokyo Alert was, so I looked it up on a search engine, but there was neither a site nor news that explained what to do." In addition, criticism of Tokyo Alert included that the new standards were difficult to understand.

The Tokyo Alert was lifted on June 11, the 10th day after it was issued. Yuriko Koike announced on June 12 that she would end the Tokyo Alert and phased closure request system. On the 15th, we decided to consider reviewing the criteria for issuing alerts. In the two weeks after the alert was lifted (June 12–25), the total number of infected people was 500, almost double the total of 252 in the previous two weeks (May 29-June 11). The Tokyo metropolitan government was cautious about reissuing the alert, fearing that economic activity would stagnate again.

==== Tokyo COVID-19 countermeasure site ====
The Tokyo Metropolitan Government COVID-19 Countermeasures Site is a website published by the Tokyo Metropolitan Government on the spread of COVID-19 infection in Tokyo.

Developed by Code for Japan, a general incorporated association, commissioned by the Tokyo Metropolitan Government. Since its release on March 3, 2020, it has exceeded 1 million PV per day. In addition, although it is unusual for a public institution website, it is open source through GitHub and receives feedback. Taking advantage of its characteristics, many derivative sites such as other prefecture versions have appeared. In addition, Taiwan's Minister of Digital Affairs Audrey Tang participated in the feedback.

It provides real-time information in an easy-to-read, simple design. It is open source and can be used by anyone. It also supports six languages: Japanese, English, Chinese (simplified and traditional), Korean, and simple Japanese. Information such as the status of testing and the number of infected people is displayed in a graph -based design, and the latest news and consultation methods are also explained.

==== Infection prevention thorough declaration sticker ====
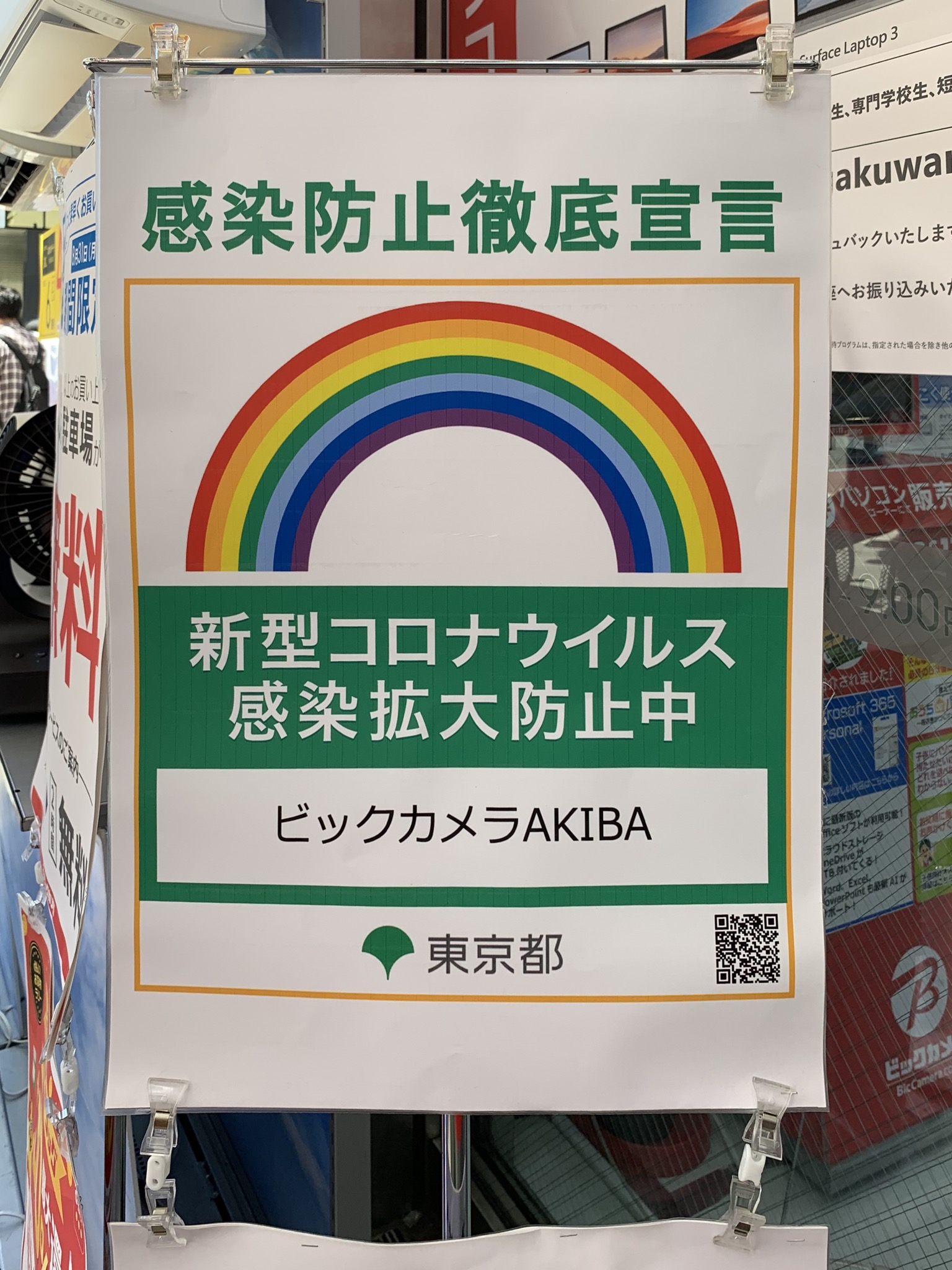
An example of the sticker

The Tokyo Metropolitan Government issued the "Thorough Infection Prevention Declaration Sticker" for the purpose of working on the infection spread prevention guidelines for businesses formulated by the metropolitan government. In the media, it is also known as the rainbow sticker. A checklist that businesses should take to prevent the spread of infection is checked on the web and issued online, and it is used as a guideline to show that businesses are working on infection prevention measures. At a press conference on July 15, Koike called on restaurants and other establishments that do not comply with the metropolitan government's guidelines to "avoid using them," and told business operators that they were following the guidelines set by the metropolitan government. As of August 13, about 175,000 stickers have been issued, and the number of stickers has reached about 190,000. Starting on the 3rd, when restaurants and other establishments were asked to operate at shorter hours, the number of stores that put up the stickers gradually increased, partly due to the fact that posting the stickers was a condition for receiving the cooperation money. Koike says, "I want to fill all of Tokyo with rainbow marks, aiming for 1 million copies".

Anyone can print out the stickers by checking the items on the Tokyo Metropolitan Government website. In August, a mass infection was confirmed at a restaurant that posted the sticker, and the Tokyo Metropolitan Government said, "We will check to what extent the guidelines have been followed."

== Socio-economic impact ==
The Tokyo One Piece Tower closed down permanently on July 31, 2020, due to the impact of the pandemic on its management. The 2020 Tokyo Rainbow Pride parade was cancelled.

=== 2020 Summer Olympics ===
In January 2020, concerns were raised about the potential impact of the COVID-19 pandemic on athletes and visitors to the Summer Olympic Games. Tokyo organizers and the International Olympic Committee insisted they were monitoring the spread of the disease to minimize its effects on preparations for the Olympics. The IOC stated that in 2020, their Japanese partners and Prime Minister Shinzo Abe "made it very clear that Japan could not manage a postponement beyond next summer [2021] at the latest". Unlike the case for Zika virus during the 2016 Summer Olympics in Rio de Janeiro, SARS-CoV-2 can be transmitted directly between humans, posing tougher challenges for the organizers to counteract the infectious disease and host a safe and secure event. Also unlike the case for H1N1 "swine flu" during the 2010 Winter Olympics in Vancouver, COVID-19 has a higher fatality rate, and there was no effective vaccine until December 2020. In a February 2020 interview, Conservative London mayoral candidate Shaun Bailey argued that London would be able to host the Olympic Games at the former 2012 Olympic venues should the Games need to be moved because of the COVID-19 pandemic. Tokyo Governor Yuriko Koike criticized Bailey's comment as inappropriate. In early 2021, officials in the US state of Florida offered to host the delayed Games in their state, while John Coates, the IOC vice president in charge of the Tokyo Olympics, said the Games would open even if the city and other parts of Japan were under a state of emergency because of COVID-19. (Full article...)

== See also ==
- COVID-19 pandemic in Japan
