= List of athletes not attending the 2022 Winter Olympics due to COVID-19 concerns =

List of athletes

A number of sportspeople eligible for the 2022 Winter Olympics in Beijing stated that they would not attend because of the COVID-19 pandemic in China. In the case of some sports, media speculated that some absentees were unenthusiastic about competing in any case and used COVID-19 as a convenient excuse.

== List ==
=== Qualified but withdrew due to COVID-19 concerns ===
Sport	Athlete	Nationality/Team	Ref
Ice hockey	National Hockey League players	Canada	
Ice hockey	National Hockey League players	United States	

=== Qualified but withdrew due to testing positive for COVID-19 ===
Sport	Athlete	Nationality/Team	Ref
Figure skating	Vincent Zhou	United States	
Ski jumping	Marita Kramer	Austria	

== See also ==
- List of athletes not attending the 2020 Summer Olympics due to COVID-19 concerns
- List of athletes not attending the 2020 Summer Paralympics due to COVID-19 concerns
- List of athletes not attending the 2016 Summer Olympics due to Zika virus concerns
