= Hitoshi Oshitani =

Japanese professor, virologist, medical doctor and scientist

- Born: 29 April 1959 (age 67); Tokyo, Japan
- Education: Tohoku University; University of Texas Health Science Center at Houston
- Occupations: professor, medical doctor and scientist

Hitoshi Oshitani (押谷仁, Oshitani Hitoshi, born 29 April 1959) is a Japanese university professor, virologist, medical doctor, public health expert and scientist who currently serves as the professor of virology, Department of Microbiology at Tohoku University. He is acclaimed and accredited with the crafting of the successful pandemic strategy of Japan called the "Three C's": Avoiding closed spaces, crowds and contact situations. He has been dubbed as the global ambassador of the "Japanese Model". He is also an integral member of the expert panel advising the Government of Japan in handling the COVID-19 pandemic in Japan. Despite being regarded as a prominent figure in Japanese health sector during the COVID-19 pandemic, he maintains a low profile.

== Career ==
Oshitani initially intended to pursue his career in the field of anthropology in which he had a firm interest. However, he later decided to embark on a different field choosing medicine. After practicing and specialising in the field of medicine, he became a paediatrician. He obtained PhD in microbiology from the Tohoku University in Sendai. He also received a master's degree in public health in 1996 from the University of Texas Health Science Center at Houston.

He gained his first experience working for Japan International Cooperation Agency in Zambia as a virologist for a period of three years between 1991 and 1994. He also worked as a regional advisor in Communicable Disease Surveillance and Response at the Western Pacific regional office of the World Health Organization in Manila between 1999 and 2005. He also served as an advisor to WHO during the SARS pandemic in China which emerged in the early 2000s.

In July 2017, he became a member of the Miyagi Prefecture Infectious Disease Control Committee. He also became a member of the New Infectious Disease Control Advisor Team in 2018. In May 2018, he became the chairman of the Tokyo Metropolitan Advisory Council on Countermeasures against New Influenza. Since August 2018, he has been a member of the Advisory Council on Countermeasures against New Influenza. In February 2020, he was appointed as a member of the Expert Council for Countermeasures against New Coronavirus Infectious Diseases, which was established under the government's Headquarters for Countermeasures against New Coronavirus Infectious Diseases.

During early parts of March 2020, during the first wave of the global coronavirus pandemic he repeatedly called for implementation of the Three C's (3つの密, Mittsu no Mitsu) method as a safety precautionary measure in contrast to the other leading public health experts who were more focused on advising people regarding the wearing masks and washing hands on regular basis. His strategy effectively succeeded well in Japan during the first few months of 2020 ever since the outbreak of the pandemic. Japan was able to control the number of fatalities to a considerable number without even implementing a lockdown but the strategy later became ineffective due to the beginning of winter season in Japan which resulted in rapid surge of COVID-19 cases. Oshitani initially received widespread criticism and backlash globally for his theories and research work regarding the spread of the COVID-19 but his theories were later accepted by many of the public health experts in the world.

He also conducted various webinars and interviews giving awareness about the impact of COVID-19 and has also been an active regular speaker on the public health sector of Japan. He has also been a vocal critic of Japanese organisers over the conducting of the 2020 Summer Olympics as he publicly raised his objections over the lead up to the Olympics stating "its 100% impossible to have an Olympics with zero risks".
