= Alhaji N'jai =

Dr. Alhaji Umar N'jai is a Sierra Leonean Ebola researcher and nonprofit founder.

== Career ==
While working as a pathologist at the University of Wisconsin, Madison, N'jai worked on developing an Ebola vaccine. He also hosted a radio show, the Pan Africa Radio Show, on WORT. In conjunction with Project 1808, a nonprofit he founded, N'jai has led trainings in Sierra Leone on preparing for potential Ebola outbreaks.
