= The Great Hanshin-Awaji Earthquake Memorial Disaster Reduction and Human Renovation Institution =

- 阪神・淡路大震災記念 人と防災未来センター
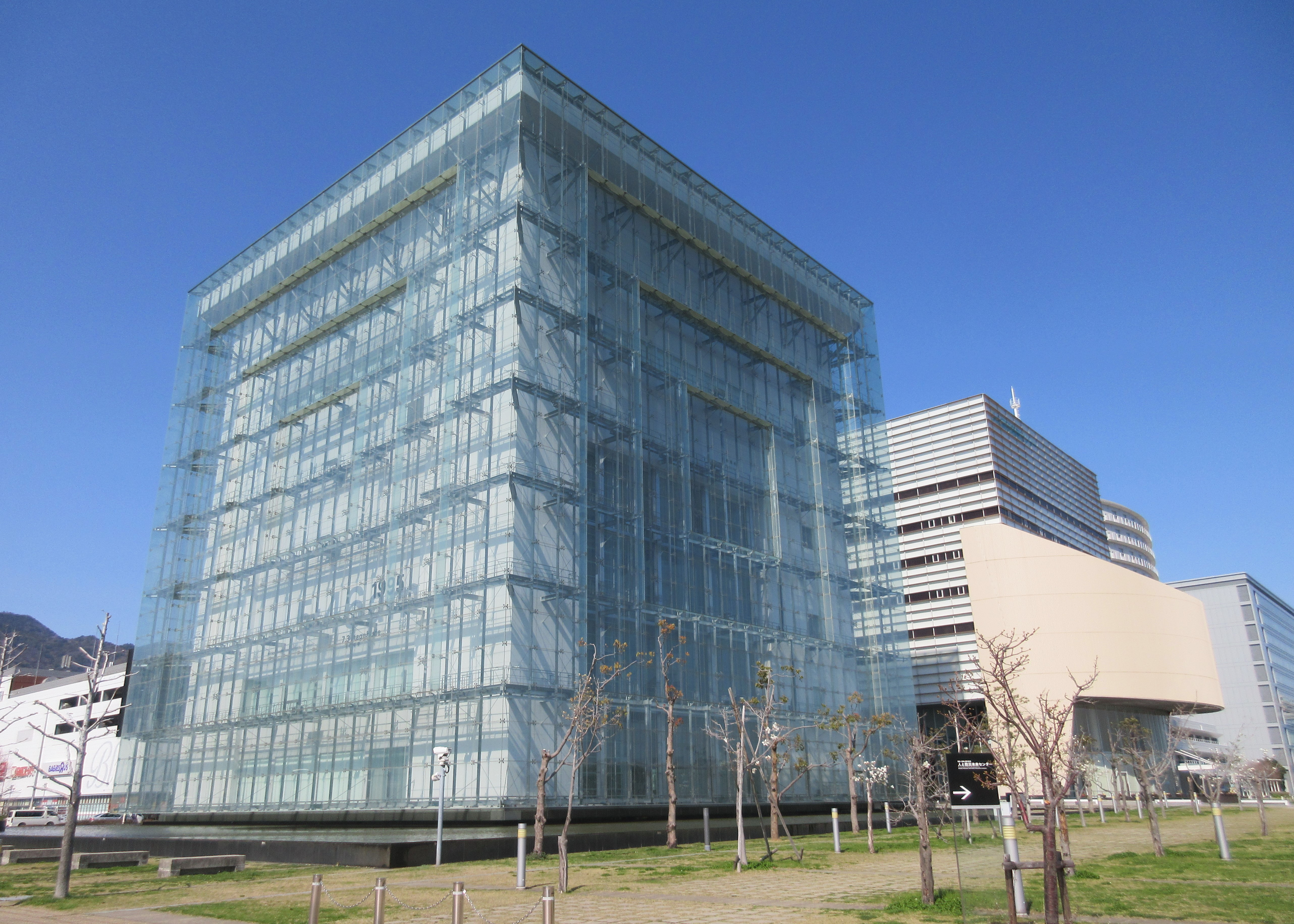
- Disaster Reduction and Human Renovation Institution

- Location within Hyōgo Prefecture

General information
- Location: 1-5-2 Wakinohama Kaigandōri, Chūō-ku, Kobe, Hyōgo Prefecture, Japan
- Coordinates: 34°41′54″N 135°12′53″E
- Opened: April 2002

Website
- Official website

The Great Hanshin-Awaji Earthquake Memorial Disaster Reduction and Human Renovation Institution (阪神・淡路大震災記念 人と防災未来センター) is the earthquake disaster memorial museum that located in Chūō-ku, Kobe (HAT Kobe), Hyōgo Prefecture in Japan. It collects and preserves materials related to the Great Hanshin-Awaji Earthquake and subsequent reconstruction.
