= Yoshihiro Kawaoka =

Japanese researcher

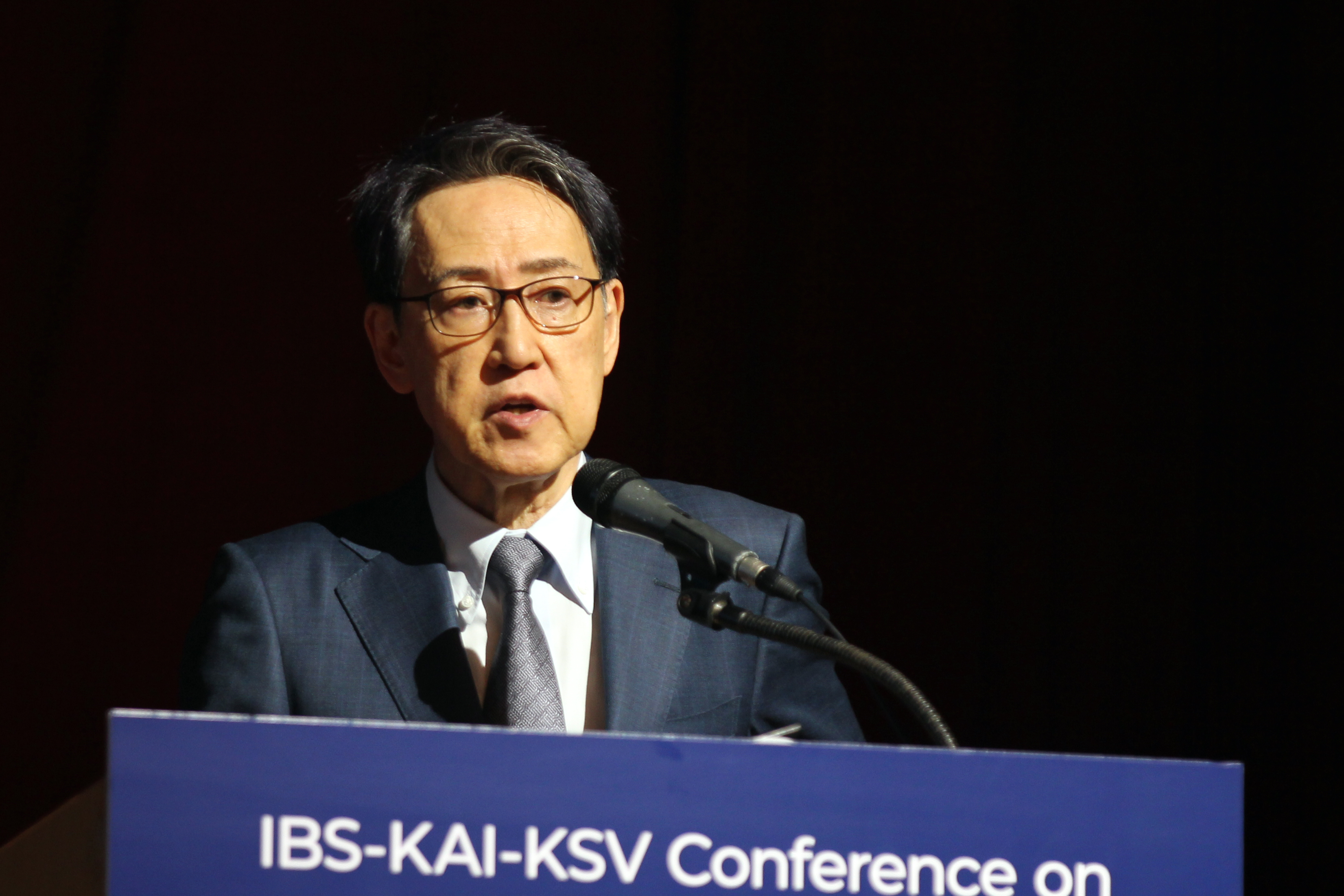
- Born: November 14, 1955 (age 70); Kobe, Japan
- Education: Hokkaido University
- Occupations: Virologist, professor at University of Wisconsin-Madison and University of Tokyo
- Known for: Studies of influenza and Ebola viruses
- Awards: Robert Koch Prize (2006); Carlos J. Finlay Prize for Microbiology (2015); Japan Academy Prize (2016); Keio Medical Science Prize (2022)

Yoshihiro Kawaoka (河岡 義裕, Kawaoka Yoshihiro; born November 14, 1955) is a virologist specializing in the study of the influenza and Ebola viruses. He holds a professorship in virology in the Department of Pathobiological Sciences at the University of Wisconsin-Madison, USA, and at the University of Tokyo, Japan.

Following the West African Ebola virus epidemic of 2014, Kawaoka attempted to develop an Ebola vaccine working in close coordination with Alhaji N'jai, a toxicologist at the University of Wisconsin–Madison and his non-profit organization Project 1808, Inc.

== Controversial experiment ==
Kawaoka created a new virus based on H5N1, which he revealed to the public in 2011. For now, no known vaccine has been developed. His research was halted by a moratorium issued from the US government in 2014. However, in 2019 he was allowed to resume the research.

Dan Brown mentioned the experiment in his novel Inferno.

== Recognition ==
- 2006 – Robert Koch Prize (with Peter Palese)
- 2011 – Medal with Purple Ribbon
- 2013 – Members of the United States National Academy of Sciences
- 2014 – Popular Mechanics Breakthrough Award
- 2015 – Carlos J. Finlay Prize for Microbiology
- 2016 – Japan Academy Prize
- 2018 – Sir Michael Stoker Prize
- 2022 – Keio Medical Science Prize
- 2023 – Person of Cultural Merit

== Selected publications ==
- Jasenosky, Luke D; Neumann, Gabriele; Lukashevich, Igor; Kawaoka, Y (2001-06-01). "Ebola virus vp40-induced particle formation and association with the lipid bilayer". J Virol. 75 (11): 5205–5214. doi:10.1128/JVI.75.11.5205-5214.2001. OCLC 6965132858. PMC 114926. PMID 11333902.
- Watanabe, Tokiko; Watanabe, Shinji; Ito, Hiroshi; Kida, Hiroshi; Kawaoka, Y (2001-06-15). "Influenza A virus can undergo multiple cycles of replication without m2 ion channel activity". J Virol. 75 (12): 5656–5662. doi:10.1128/jvi.75.12.5656-5662.2001. PMC 114278. PMID 11356973.
- Schultz-Cherry, S; Dybdahl-Sissoko, N; Neumann, G; Kawaoka, Y; Hinshaw VS (2001-09-01). "Influenza Virus NS1 Protein Induces Apoptosis in Cultured Cells". J Virol. 75 (17): 7875–7881. doi:10.1128/jvi.75.17.7875-7881.2001. ISSN 0022-538X. OCLC 120974346. PMC 115031. PMID 11483732.
- Hatta, M; Gao, P; Halfmann, P; Kawaoka, Y (2001-09-07). "Molecular basis for high virulence of Hong Kong H5N1 influenza A viruses". Science. 293 (298): 1840–1842. Bibcode:2001Sci...293.1840H. doi:10.1126/science.1062882. ISSN 0036-8075. OCLC 95118961. PMID 11546875. S2CID 37415902.
- Goto, Hideo; Wells, Krisna; Takada, Ayato; Kawaoka, Y. (2001-10-01). "Plasminogen-binding activity of neuraminidase determines the pathogenicity of influenza A virus". J Virol. 75 (19): 9297–9301. doi:10.1128/jvi.75.19.9297-9301.2001. ISSN 0022-538X. OCLC 6965138857. PMC 114497. PMID 11533192.
- Kobasa, Darwyn; Wells, Krisna; Kawaoka, Yoshihiro (2001-12-01). "Amino Acids Responsible for the Absolute Sialidase Activity of the Influenza A Virus Neuraminidase: Relationship to Growth in Duck Intestine". J Virol. 75 (23): 11773–11780. doi:10.1128/jvi.75.23.11773-11780.2001. OCLC 4639538185. PMC 114763. PMID 11689658.
- Kawaoka, Y; Neumann, Gabriele (2012). Influenza Virus : Methods and Protocols. Methods in Molecular Biology, Methods and Protocols, 865. Vol. 865. Springer. doi:10.1007/978-1-61779-621-0. ISBN 978-1-61779-620-3. S2CID 3687150.
- Watanabe, Tokiko; Kawaoka, Yoshihiro (June 2016). "Ebora shukketsu netsu no seiatsu ni mukete : Wakuchin kaihatsu to shierareone de no kenkyu" [Control of Ebola hemorrhagic fever : vaccine development and our Ebola project in Sierra Leone]. Virus (in Japanese). 66 (1): 53–62. doi:10.2222/jsv.66.53. ISBN 9781617796203. ISSN 0042-6857. OCLC 6807788600. PMID 28484179.
