= Daidogei World Cup =

Daidogei World Cup (大道芸ワールドカップ, Daidōgei Wārudo Kappu) is a street performance festival and competition held annually in Shizuoka City, Japan each November.

== History ==
The Daidogei World Cup first took place in 1992. Planning for the first event took three years, and the turnout of 1.5 million visitors exceeded the planners' expectations. From 2005, it expanded from a 3-day to a 4-day festival.

The 2020 event, scheduled to run from 31 October to 3 November, was cancelled due to the impact of the COVID-19 pandemic. This was the first time that the event had been cancelled.

== Overview ==
The Daidogei World Cup is an annual international festival of buskers, held in November. Performers come from around the world and perform throughout the central part of the city as well as in some peripheral locations. It is a very popular event in Shizuoka, as well as among performers, and very competitive for performers to gain entry to the festival.

The festival is held mainly all around downtown Shizuoka City, with the main stage in centrally located Sunpu Park (駿府公園, Sunpu kōen).

== Administration ==
Daidogei is administered by the Daidogei World Cup Executive Committee, headquartered at Aiwa Building, in the Aoi Ward of Shizuoka City. It is executed by a staff of 2,800 people.
