= Shigekazu Nagata =

Japanese biochemist

- 長田 重一
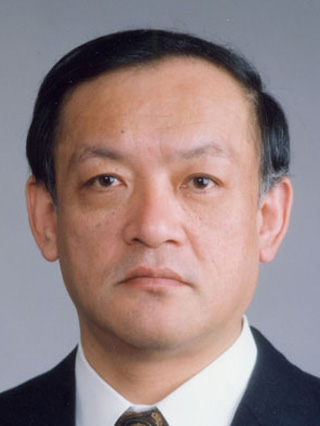
- Nagata in 2020
- Born: 1949 (age 76–77); Kanazawa, Ishikawa, Japan
- Education: University of Tokyo
- Known for: Interferon; Granulocyte colony-stimulating factor Fas ligand Fas receptor Apoptosis
- Awards: Robert Koch Prize (1995); Imperial Prize (2000)
- Scientific career
- Fields: Biochemistry; Immunology
- Workplaces: Kyoto University; Osaka University; Osaka Bioscience Institute; University of Tokyo; University of Zurich
- Doctoral advisor: Yoshito Kaziro

Shigekazu Nagata (長田 重一, Nagata Shigekazu; born 1949) is a Japanese biochemist, best known for research on apoptosis, the process of programmed cell death occurring in multi-cellular organisms.

== Contribution ==
Nagata identified Interferon in 1980 and Granulocyte colony-stimulating factor in 1986. He also identified a death factor (Fas receptor) in 1991 and its ligand (Fas ligand) in 1993, and elucidated their physiological and pathological roles in apoptosis.

== Biography ==
Nagata was born in Kanazawa, Japan, and completed his PhD under the supervision of Yoshito Kaziro at the University of Tokyo in 1977.

Nagata served as a postdoctoral fellow under Charles Weissmann at University of Zurich, where he worked on sequencing the cDNA of Interferon gene between 1977 and 1981. He was assistant professor at the Institute of Medical Science, the University of Tokyo between 1982 and 1987, and Head of Department of molecular biology at Osaka Bioscience Institute between 1987 and 1998, where Osamu Hayaishi served as president at that time.

Nagata became Professor of genetics at Osaka University Medical School between 1995 and 2007, before being appointed as Professor of medical chemistry at the Graduate School of Medicine, Kyoto University in 2007.

After retiring from Kyoto University and becoming Professor Emeritus in 2015, Nagata has been Professor of biochemistry and immunology at the Immunology Frontier Research Center, Osaka University.

== Honors and awards ==
- 1994: Emil von Boehring Prize, Marburg University
- 1995: Robert Koch Prize
- 1996: Prix Lacassagne, French Cancer League
- 1998: Asahi Prize
- 2000: Imperial Prize of the Japan Academy
- 2001: Person of Cultural Merit
- 2004: Cell Death Society Prize, International Cell Death Society
- 2010: Member of the Japan Academy
- 2012: Honorary Doctorate, University of Zurich
- 2012: Tomizo Yoshida Award, Japanese Cancer Association and Tomizo Yoshida Memorial Hall
- 2012: Debrecen Award for Molecular Medicine
- 2013: Keio Medical Science Prize
- 2015: Foreign Associate of the United States National Academy of Sciences
- 2016: Asian Scientist 100, Asian Scientist
- 2026: Order of Culture
