= Takashi Sugimura =

Japanese cancer researcher (1926–2020)

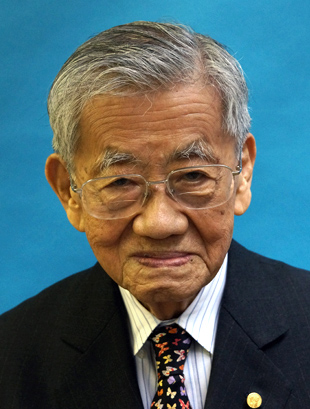
- Born: April 20, 1926; Tokyo, Japan
- Died: September 6, 2020 (aged 94)
- Education: University of Tokyo
- Known for: Carcinogenesis
- Awards: Charles S. Mott Prize (1981); Japan Prize (1997)
- Scientific career
- Fields: Biochemistry; Cancer Research
- Workplaces: National Cancer Center; University of Tokyo; Japanese Foundation for Cancer Research

Takashi Sugimura (杉村 隆, Sugimura Takashi; April 20, 1926 – September 6, 2020) was a Japanese biochemist, famous for research on chemical carcinogens. He received the Japan Prize for the contribution to establishment of fundamental concept on causes of cancer. He was elected as President of the Japan Academy on October 15, 2013, serving till 2016 and was followed by Hiroshi Shiono.

== Contribution ==
Sugimura isolated and identified many mutagens with a structure of heterocyclic amine from foods cooked under ordinary conditions. He showed that tumors induced by these heterocyclic amines had genetic alterations. He further developed his studies to analyze multiple-step carcinogenesis at molecular levels to promote effective primary prevention of cancer. His group identified the novel polymer poly(ADP-ribose) and demonstrated the presence of the enzyme poly ADP ribose polymerase (PARP). He also discovered the cognate catabolic enzyme, poly(ADP-ribose) glycohydrolase (PARG) and further elucidated the biology of poly(ADP-ribose). The discovery of pierisin, an apoptogenic peptide that ADP-ribosylates DNA, profoundly illuminates his scientific character and curiosity as well.

== Biography ==
Sugimura completed his M.D. in 1949 from the Faculty of Medicine, University of Tokyo, and received the degree of Doctor of Medical Science in 1957 from the same institution. After his postdoctoral fellowship at the Cancer Institute, Japanese Foundation for Cancer Research, he became Chief of Biochemistry Division at the Research Institute, National Cancer Center in Tokyo in 1962, where he served as President from 1984 to 1991. In addition, he was Professor of Institute of Medical Science, University of Tokyo from 1970 to 1985 and President of Toho University from 1994 to 2000. He was Fellow of the American Association for Cancer Research (AACR) Academy, Honorary Member of Japanese Cancer Association and also President Emeritus of National Cancer Center.

== Recognition ==
Sugimura received numerous awards and honors which include the following:

=== Awards ===
- 1976 Imperial Prize of the Japan Academy
- 1977 Fogarty Scholar in Residence, National Institutes of Health, USA
- 1978 Outstanding Work Award, Environmental Mutagen Society of the United States
- 1981 Order of Culture
- 1981 Charles S. Mott Prize
- 1992 Tomizo Yoshida Award of the Japanese Cancer Association
- 1996 National Order of Merit (France) (Officer)
- 1997 Japan Prize

=== Honors ===
- 1982 Foreign Associate, the National Academy of Sciences, USA
- 1982 Member, the Japan Academy.
- 1987 Foreign Member, the Royal Netherlands Academy of Arts and Sciences (Division for Sciences)
- 1987 Foreign Member, the Royal Swedish Academy of Sciences (Class for Medical Sciences)
- 1994 Foreign Associate, the Institute of Medicine, National Academy of Sciences, USA

== See also ==
- List of members of the National Academy of Sciences (Medical genetics, hematology, and oncology)
