= Yusuke Nakamura (geneticist) =

Medical researcher in Japan

- 中村 祐輔
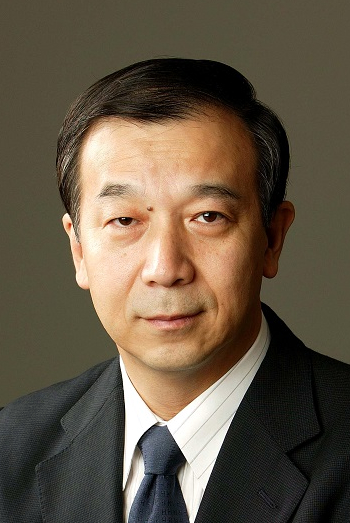
- Yūsuke Nakamura
- Born: December 8, 1952; Osaka Prefecture, Japan
- Education: Osaka University
- Known for: Development of Genome-Wide Association Study (GWAS); Identification of Tumor Suppressor Gene APC and Variable Number of Tandem Repeat (VNTR) markers
- Awards: Keio Medical Science Prize (2000); Medal of Honor with purple ribbon (2004); Clarivate Citation Laureate (2020)
- Scientific career
- Fields: Molecular genetics Cancer research
- Workplaces: Japanese Cabinet Office; University of Chicago; RIKEN; University of Tokyo; Japanese Foundation for Cancer Research; University of Utah

Yusuke Nakamura (中村 祐輔, Nakamura Yūsuke; born 8 December 1952) is a Japanese geneticist and cancer researcher best known for developing Genome-Wide Association Study (GWAS). He is one of the world's pioneers in applying genetic variations (Variable Number Tandem Repeat (VNTR) and Single Nucleotide Polymorphism (SNP) markers) and whole genome sequencing, leading the research field of personalized medicine.

== Scientific Contribution ==
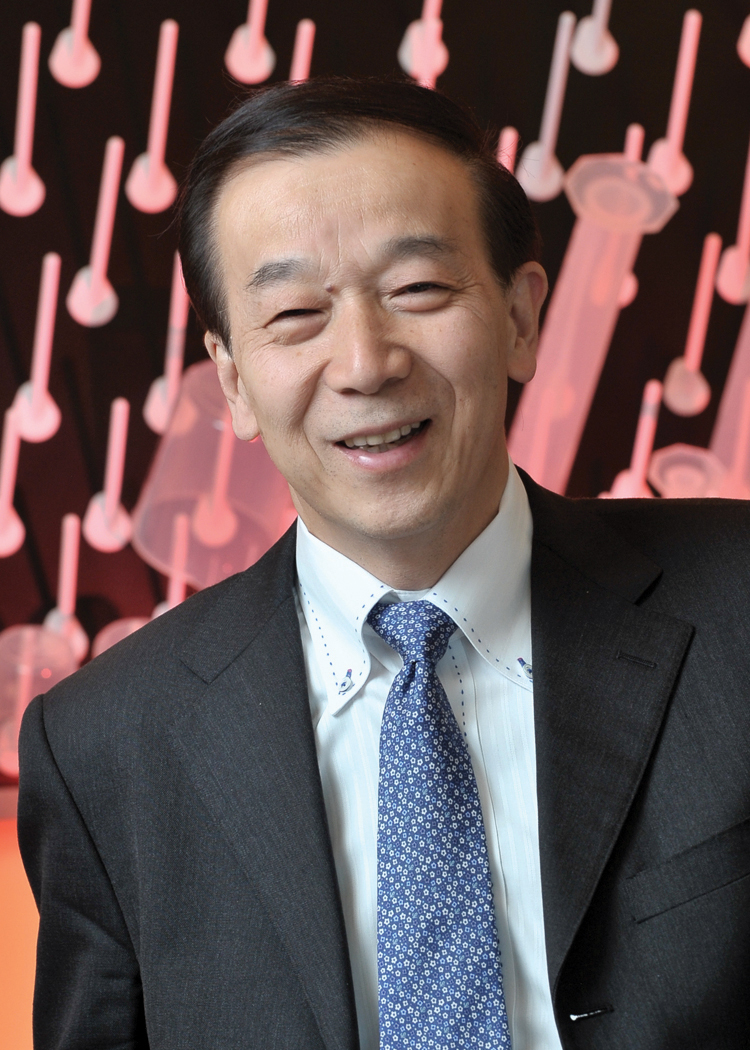
Yūsuke Nakamura

Nakamura successfully identified VNTR markers in 1987 and tumor suppressor gene APC in 1991. Furthermore, several genetic polymorphic markers developed and mapped by his research groups at the Japanese Foundation for Cancer Research and the University of Tokyo, have contributed to map and clone genes responsible to hereditary diseases, as well as those related to drug response and involved in cancer.

In 2001, Nakamura and his colleagues of RIKEN SNP Research Center developed the methodology of Genome-Wide Association Study (GWAS), and using this method his research group first discovered functional SNP in the lymphotoxin-α gene that are associated with susceptibility to myocardial infarction in 2002, which was a breakthrough in the research field of medical genetics.

Furthermore, the RIKEN SNP Research Center led by him made the largest contribution in the Phase 1 HapMap project of the International HapMap Consortium published in the scientific journal Nature in 2005.

Nakamura focused on applying genetic information to improve the care of cancer patients, working to bring his laboratory's discoveries into the clinical practice.

In 2001, his cancer research at the University of Tokyo led to the formation of OncoTherapy Science, a successful public Japanese biotechnology company that concentrates on new cancer therapies.

== Life and career ==
Nakamura was born in Osaka, Japan on 8 December 1952. He received his medical degree in 1977 and his PhD in 1984 from Osaka University. While working as a surgeon in Japan, he witnessed a 27-year-old patient die of cancer, which affected him deeply.

To pursue advanced study in genetics and oncology, he went to the US and spent five years as a postdoctoral fellow and then as a faculty member at the Howard Hughes Medical Institute at the University of Utah, an international center for gene mapping.

In 1989, Nakamura became Head of the Biochemistry Department, at the Cancer Institute, Japanese Foundation for Cancer Research. He was appointed as Professor at the Institute of Medical Science, University of Tokyo in 1994. When the Japanese government launched its Millennium Genome Project in 2000, he was named group leader for the genetic diversity program at the renowned RIKEN SNP Research Center. He also served as director of the RIKEN Center from 2005 to 2010, as well as Director of National Cancer Research Research Institute from 2010 to 2011. From January to December 2011, he was Special Advisor to the Cabinet Secretary General, Office of Medical Innovation, Cabinet Secretariat, Government of Japan.

In 2012, Nakamura moved to the Department of Medicine at the University of Chicago in 2012 as Professor and deputy director, Center for Personalized Therapeutics

In 2018, after becoming the emeritus Faculty Professor of the University of Chicago and returning to Japan, he was appointed Director of Cross-ministerial Strategic Innovation Promotion Program of Japanese Cabinet Office, as well as Director at the Cancer Precision Center, Japanese Foundation for Cancer Research.

== Awards ==
Nakamura received several honors and awards include the following.

- 1992: Princess Takamatsu Cancer Research Award
- 2000: Keio Medical Science Prize for "Elucidation of various genetic diseases through human genome analysis"
- 2002: Tomizo Yoshida Award of the Japanese Cancer Association
- 2004: Japanese Medal of Honor with purple ribbon
- 2010: Chen Award for Distinguished Academic Achievement in Human Genetic and Genomic Research, Human Genome Organization (HUGO)
- 2020: Clarivate Citation Laureate
