= Mitsuaki Yoshida =

Japanese virologist (born 1939)

- Education: University of Tokyo
- Known for: Human T-lymphotropic virus 1
- Awards: Asahi Prize
- Scientific career
- Fields: Molecular biology, Virology
- Workplaces: University of Tokyo; Japanese Foundation for Cancer Research; MRC Laboratory of Molecular Biology

Mitsuaki Yoshida (吉田 光昭, Yoshida Mitsuaki; born 1939) was a Japanese virologist known for identifying the molecular structure of Human T-lymphotropic virus 1 responsible for Adult T-cell leukemia/lymphoma.

== Life ==
Yoshida was born in Toyama, Japan and received his Ph.D. in 1967 from the University of Tokyo. After his postdoctoral fellowship at MRC Laboratory of Molecular Biology, he worked to uncover the relationship between oncovirus and carcinogenesis at the Cancer Institute, Japanese Foundation for Cancer Research from 1975 to 1989. He was appointed as Professor at the Institute of Medical Science, University of Tokyo in 1989, where he served as Dean from 1996 to 1998. After retiring from the University of Tokyo and becoming Professor Emeritus, he was Director at the Tsukuba Research Institute of BANYU Pharmaceutical Co. (Merck & Co. today) in Tsukuba and Director at the Cancer Chemotherapy Center, Japanese Foundation for Cancer Research.

== Awards ==
- 1982: Princess Takamatsu Cancer Research Fund Prize
- 1986: Asahi Prize
- 1999: Tomizo Yoshida Award
- 2000: Medal with Purple Ribbon (Japanese Government)
