= Tomizo Yoshida =

Japanese pathologist

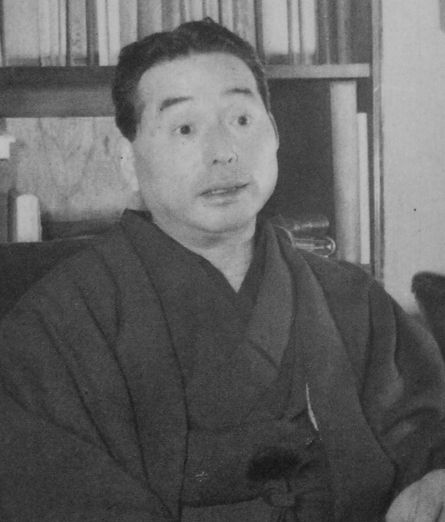
- Dr. Tomizo Yoshida (1956)
- Born: February 10, 1903; Asakawa, Fukushima, Japan
- Died: April 27, 1973 (aged 70)
- Education: Tokyo Imperial University
- Known for: Chemical Carcinogenesis; Yoshida Sarcoma
- Awards: Imperial Prize (1936 and 1953); Order of Culture (1959); Koch Medal (1963)
- Scientific career
- Fields: Pathology; Cancer research
- Workplaces: Japanese Foundation for Cancer Research; Sasaki Institute; University of Tokyo; Tohoku University; Nagasaki University

Tomizo Yoshida (吉田 富三, Yoshida Tomizō; 1903–1973) was a prominent Japanese pathologist, famous for discovering the Yoshida sarcoma. In addition, he is known for demonstrating the chemical-induced hepatocarcinogenesis in rats with his mentor Takaoki Sasaki.

Yoshida received the Imperial Prize of the Japan Academy twice (1936 and 1953) as well as the Robert Koch Gold Medal (1963).

== Contribution ==
In the 1930s Yoshida and Sasaki showed the induction of liver cancer in rats by Ortho-Aminoazotoluene. Since that time, a large amount of data has confirmed the carcinogenic activity of Azo dyes.

In 1943, Yoshida found a cancer cell line, so-called Yoshida Sarcoma, and experimentally proved that cancer is generated from cancer cells. His findings opened the way of cancer research in terms of cells, and developed biomedical research on chemotherapy.

== Biography ==
Yoshida was born in Asakawa, Fukushima and graduated from the Medical School, Imperial University of Tokyo in 1927. He was an assistant professor of pathology at the same institution from 1927 to 1929. In 1929 he moved to the Sasaki Institute to work on chemical-induced carcinogenesis with Takaoki Sasaki, before he went to Germany to study pathology in 1935.

After returning to his homeland, Yoshida served as a professor of pathology at Nagasaki University from 1938 to 1944, Tohoku University from 1944 to 1952, before being appointed as a professor of pathology at the Faculty of Medicine, University of Tokyo in 1952, where he became a dean in 1958. In addition, he became a director at the Sasaki Institute in 1953 and at the Cancer Institute, Japanese Foundation for Cancer Research in 1963.

Yoshida died in 1973 at the age of 70.

== Recognition ==
- 1936 Imperial Prize of the Japan Academy
- 1952 Asahi Prize
- 1953 Imperial Prize of the Japan Academy
- 1956 Scheele Medal
- 1959 Order of Culture
- 1963 Robert Koch Gold Medal
- 1965 Elected Member of the Japan Academy.
- 1965 Elected Honorary Citizen of Asakawa
- 1968 Honorary Doctorate, University of Milan

== Tomizo Yoshida Award ==
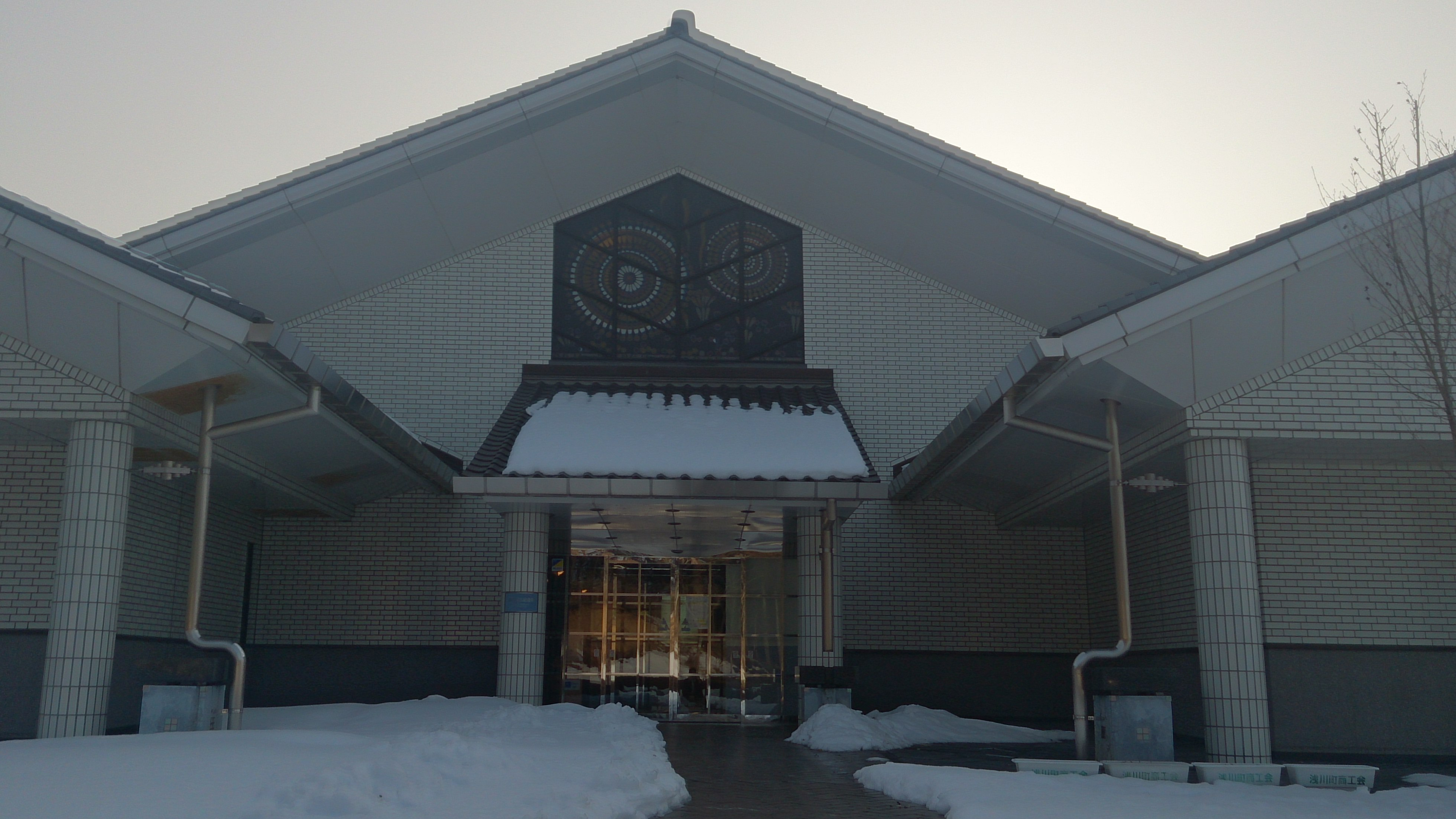
Tomizo Yoshida Memorial Hall in Asakawa, Fukushima

Since 1992 the Japanese Cancer Association, the town office of Asakawa, and Tomizo Yoshida Memorial Hall have annually awarded the Tomizo Yoshida Award to researchers who made outstanding achievement in the field of cancer research. At the annual award presentation held in Asakawa, Fukushima, winners receive one million yen and a diploma.

Past award winners include the following:

- 1992 Takashi Sugimura, National Cancer Center (Japan)
- 1999 Mitsuaki Yoshida, BANYU Pharmaceutical Co.
- 2002 Yusuke Nakamura, University of Tokyo
- 2008 Tadatsugu Taniguchi, University of Tokyo
- 2012 Shigekazu Nagata, Kyoto University

== Yamagiwa-Yoshida Memorial international study grants ==
After his death, Japanese cancer researchers established the Yamagiwa-Yoshida Memorial international study grants in honor of Katsusaburō Yamagiwa and Tomizo Yoshida. Since its inception in 1975, the grants supported by the Japan National Committee, Union for International Cancer Control, have contributed to the development of the professional capacity of over 330 Fellows from over 40 countries.
