= Tadatsugu Taniguchi =

Japanese immunologist (born 1948)

- 谷口 維紹
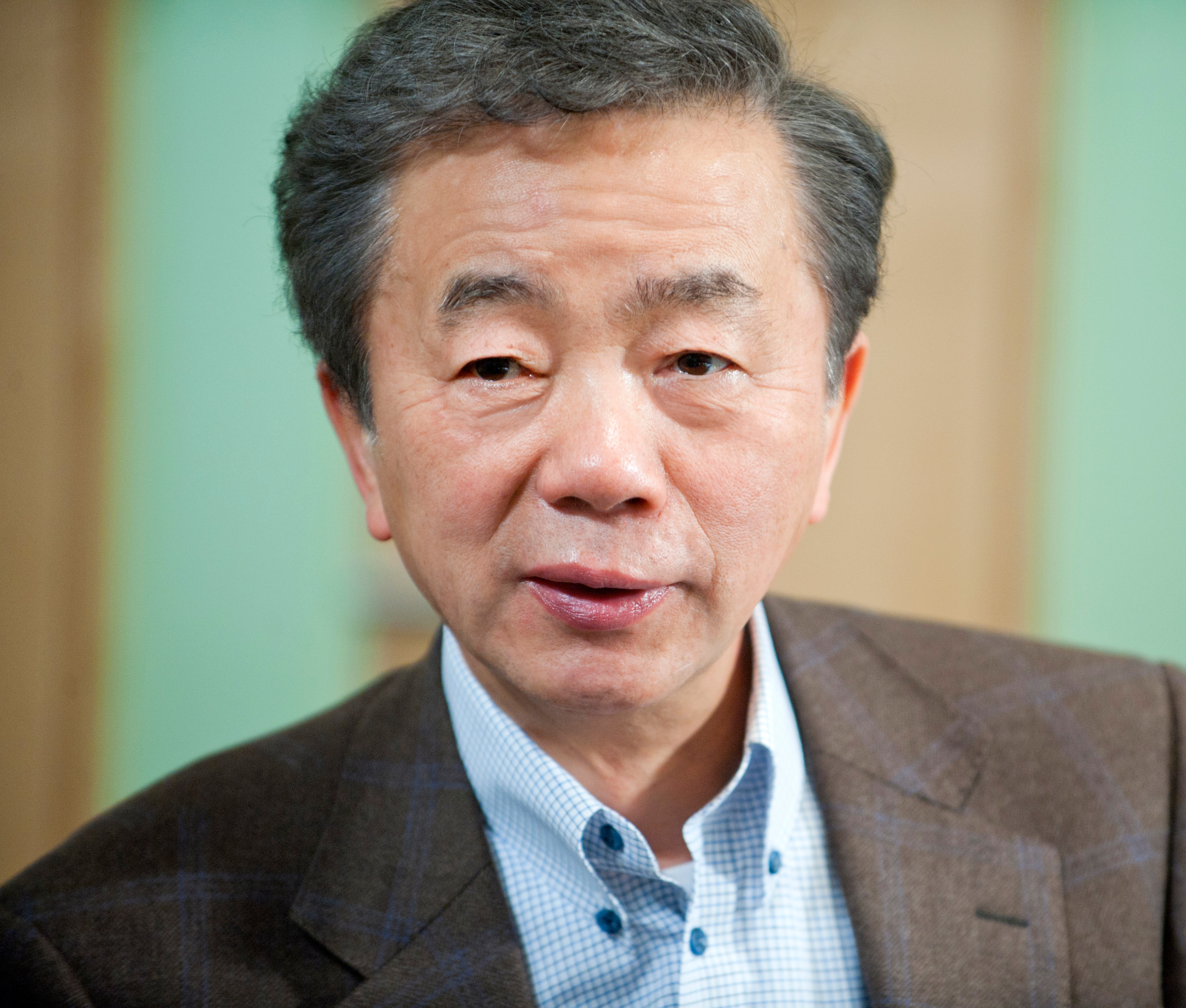
- Born: January 1, 1948 (age 78); Aridagawa, Wakayama, Japan
- Education: University of Zurich; Tokyo University of Education
- Known for: Interferons; Interferon regulatory factors
- Awards: Robert Koch Prize; Japan Academy Prize; Keio Medical Science Prize (1997); Asahi Prize (1988)
- Scientific career
- Fields: Immunology; Oncology
- Workplaces: University of Tokyo; Osaka University; New York University; Japanese Foundation for Cancer Research
- Doctoral advisor: Charles Weissmann

Tadatsugu Taniguchi (谷口 維紹, Taniguchi Tadatsugu; born January 1, 1948 in Wakayama Prefecture) is a Japanese immunologist known for his pioneer research on Interferons and Interferon regulatory factors.

== Contribution ==
Taniguchi's work is mostly focused on immunity and oncogenesis, in particular on the mechanisms of signal transduction and gene expression. While working at the Cancer Institute in Tokyo, he conducted breakthrough research on sequencing the cDNA, and identified two cytokine genes, interferon-beta and interleukin-2. These advances helped characterize various cytokines and discover a new family of transcription factors, interferon regulatory factors, which play essential roles in the immune system and cancer.

== Biography ==
After graduating in biology from the Tokyo University of Education in 1971, Taniguchi worked at the Laboratory of Biochemistry, University of Naples, Italy from 1972 to 1974. He then went to the University of Zurich, where in 1978 he received his doctorate in molecular biology under the supervision of Charles Weissmann. The same year he started working at the Cancer Institute, Japanese Foundation for Cancer Research. Then for two years he was a visiting associate professor at New York University, and in 1984 was appointed as professor of molecular and cell biology at Osaka University. From 1995 to 2012, he was a professor at the Faculty of Medicine, the University of Tokyo. Since 2012, he has been a professor at the Institute of Industrial Science, the University of Tokyo. He is also an adjunct professor at the New York University School of Medicine.

== Honors and awards ==
- Milstein Award (1988)
- Asahi Prize (1989)
- Robert Koch Prize (1991)
- Keio Medical Science Prize (1997)
- Japan Academy Prize (2000)
- Member, National Academy of Sciences (US, since 2003)
- Pezcoller-AACR International Award for Cancer Research (2006)
- Tomizo Yoshida Award, Japanese Cancer Association (2008)
- Honorary Doctor, University of Zurich (2007)
- Person of Cultural Merit (2009)
- Honorary citizen, Aridagawa, Wakayama (since 2010)
- Order of Culture (2023)
- Emory Max Cooper Prize in Immunology (2026)

== Editorial activities ==
He is an editor of the journals Proceedings of the National Academy of Sciences, eLife and Immunity.

== See also ==
- List of members of the National Academy of Sciences (Immunology)
