= Keio Medical Science Prize =

Annual Japanese award

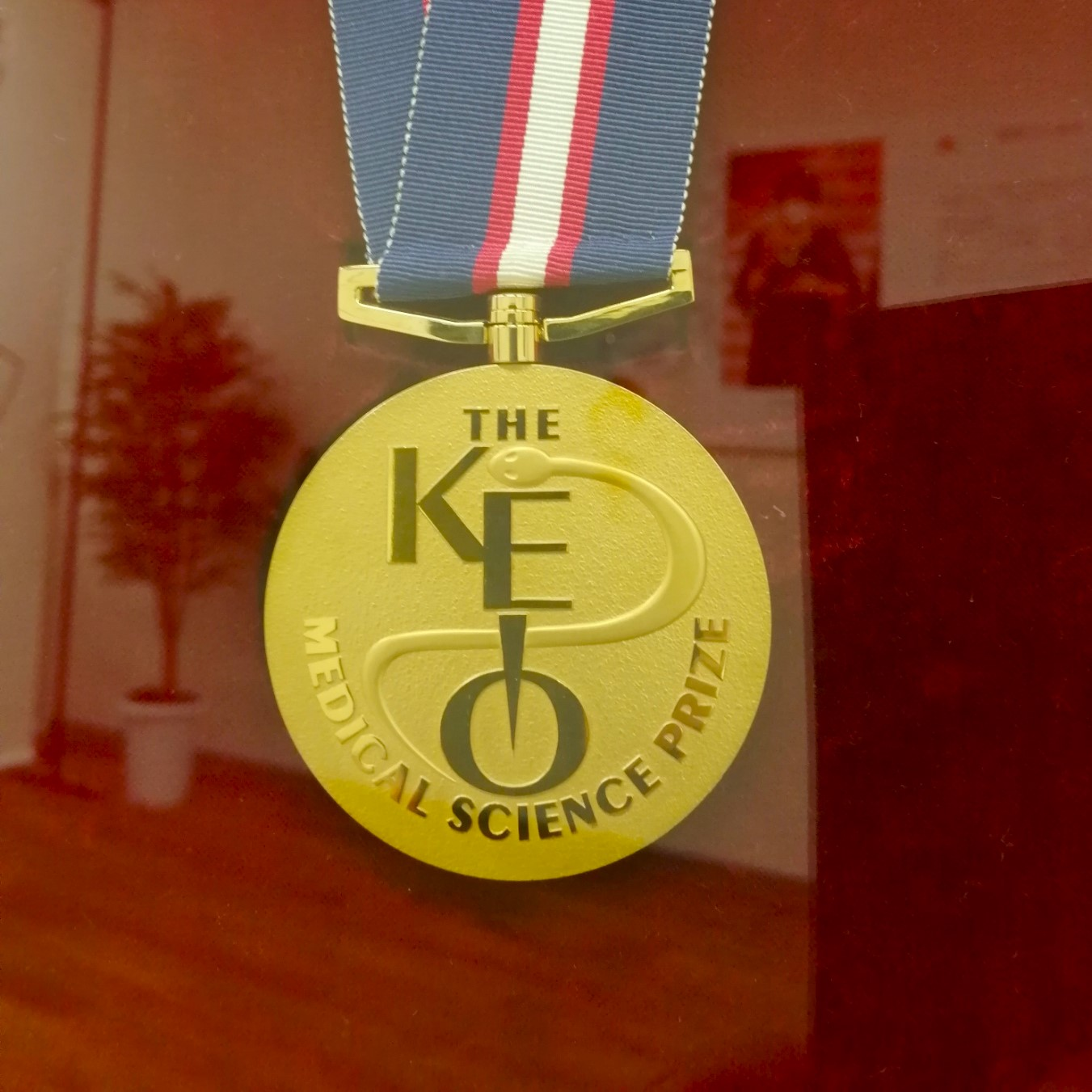
Keio Medical Science Prize medal

The Keio Medical Science Prize (Japanese: 慶應医学賞) is a Japanese prize in medical sciences.

== Introduction ==
The prize is awarded to scientists who made significant contributions to the field of medical sciences or life sciences. And these contributions can further promote the peace and prosperity of mankind and human society.

The prize award is 20 million Japanese Yen (approximately 180,000 US$). A medal is also awarded to the winner. Every year maximum two winners are awarded. A prize ceremony is held every year normally at Keio University, Tokyo, Japan.

== Awardees ==
Source: Keio University

- 1996 – Stanley B. Prusiner and Shigetada Nakanishi
- 1997 – Robert A. Weinberg and Tadatsugu Taniguchi
- 1998 – Moses Judah Folkman and Katsuhiko Mikoshiba
- 1999 – Elizabeth Helen Blackburn and Shinya Yoshikawa
- 2000 – Arnold J. Levine and Yusuke Nakamura
- 2001 – Tony Hunter and Masatoshi Takeichi
- 2002 – Barry Marshall and Koichi Tanaka
- 2003 – Ronald M. Evans and Yasushi Miyashita
- 2004 – Roger Y. Tsien
- 2005 – Yoshinori Fujiyoshi
- 2006 – Thomas A. Steitz
- 2007 – Brian J. Druker and Hiroaki Mitsuya
- 2008 – Fred H. Gage and Shimon Sakaguchi
- 2009 – Jeffrey M. Friedman and Kenji Kangawa
- 2010 – Jules A. Hoffmann and Shizuo Akira
- 2011 – Philip A. Beachy and Keiji Tanaka
- 2012 – Steven Rosenberg and Hiroyuki Mano
- 2013 – Victor Ambros and Shigekazu Nagata
- 2014 – Karl Deisseroth and Hiroshi Hamada
- 2015 – Jeffrey I. Gordon and Yoshinori Ohsumi
- 2016 – Svante Pääbo and Tasuku Honjo
- 2017 – John Edgar Dick and Seiji Ogawa
- 2018 – Feng Zhang and Masashi Yanagisawa
- 2019 – Hans C. Clevers and Tadamitsu Kishimoto
- 2020 – Aviv Regev and Atsushi Miyawaki
- 2021 – Katalin Karikó and Osamu Nureki
- 2022 - Carl H. June and Yoshihiro Kawaoka
- 2023 - Napoleone Ferrara and Kazutoshi Mori
- 2024 - Demis Hassabis and Michinori Saitou
- 2025 - Clifford P. Brangwynne and Akiko Iwasaki

== See also ==
- Keio University
- Lasker Awards
- Gairdner Foundation Wightman Award
- Wolf Prize in Medicine
- List of medicine awards
