= Japanese Foundation for Cancer Research =

Japanese non-profit organization

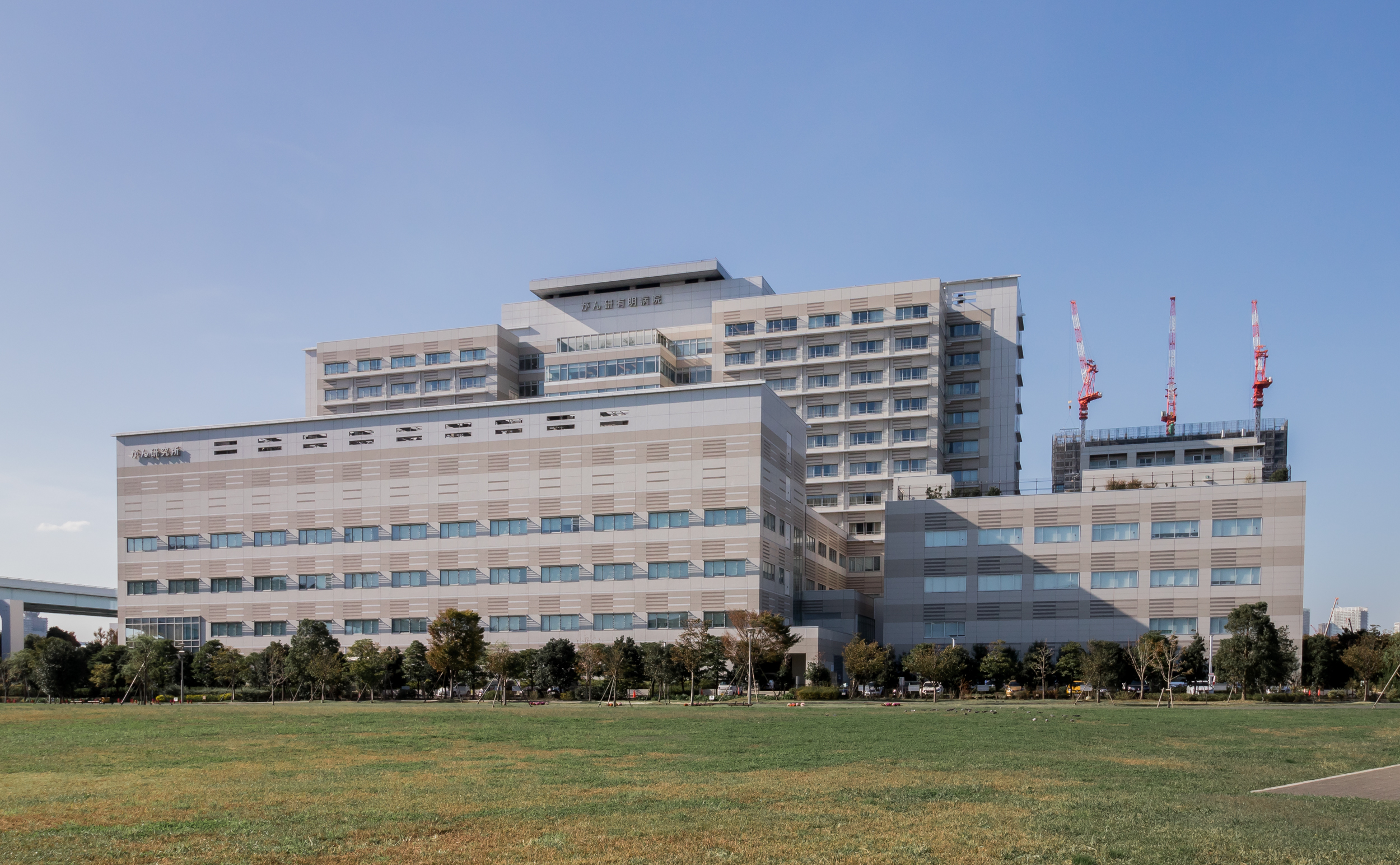
- Founded: 1908
- Founder: Katsusaburō Yamagiwa; Aoyama Tanemichi; Shibusawa Eiichi
- Purpose: Cancer research
- Location: 3-8-31, Ariake, Koto-ku, Tokyo, Japan
- Key people: Masahito, Prince Hitachi (Honorary President)
- Website: www.jfcr.or.jp/english/index.html

The Japanese Foundation for Cancer Research (公益財団法人がん研究会) (JFCR) is a non-profit cancer research organization based in Ariake, Tokyo. The JFCR was founded in 1908 as the first Japanese organization specializing in cancer by Katsusaburō Yamagiwa and his supporters. The Cancer Institute and its attached hospital of JFCR were set up in 1934. The JFCR became a full member of the Union for International Cancer Control in 1968.

== Research ==
The Cancer Institute of JFCR is one of the leading medical and biological research institutes in Japan. When the American journal Science published a special feature on science in Japan in 1992, the institute was described as one of the most productive and most cited institutions in the world at the time.

The research at the Institute covers a wide variety of biomedical fields, including biochemistry, cell biology, pathology, carcinogenesis, genomics, system biology, and biomedical engineering. Achievements include the following.

- 1979: Tadatsugu Taniguchi isolated interferon gene.
- 1983: Mitsuaki Yoshida identified the molecular structure of human T-lymphotropic virus 1 responsible for adult T-cell leukemia/lymphoma.
- 1992: Yusuke Nakamura isolated the tumor suppressor gene APC responsible for familial adenomatous polyposis.

== Hospital ==
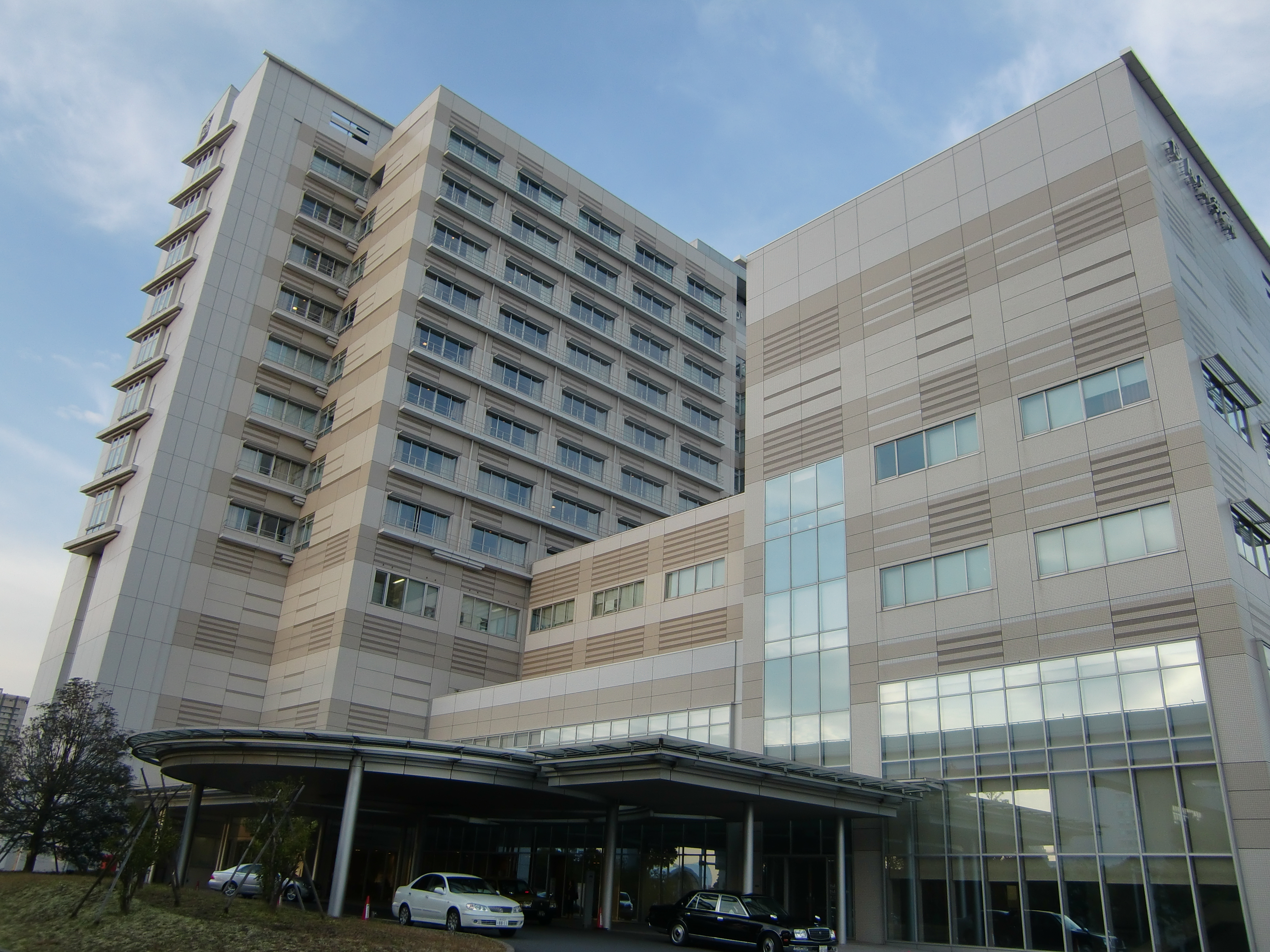
The Cancer Institute Hospital of JFCR

The Cancer Institute Hospital of JFCR was established in 1934 as Japan's only specialized cancer hospital, with just 29 beds, and the first director was Ryukichi Inada. The Hospital now has approximately 700 beds, and in fiscal 2011 it treated 61,324 outpatients and 9,690 inpatients.

Clinics and departments include Thoracic Center (Thoracic Medical Oncology and Surgical Oncology), Gastroenterology Center (Gastroenterological Internal Medicine and Surgery), Breast Oncology Center (Breast Medical Oncology and Surgical Oncology), Gynecological Oncology, Head and Neck Oncology, Orthopedic Oncology, Genitourinary Oncology, Hematology Oncology, Medical Oncology, Sarcoma Center, Palliative Therapy, General Medicine, Anesthesiology/Pain Service, Psycho-Oncology, Plastic and Reconstructive Surgery, Ophthalmology, Infectious Disease, Chinese Herbal Medicine, Dentistry, Radiation Oncology, Diagnostic Radiology, Endoscopy, Comprehensive Medical Oncology, Clinical Genetic Oncology, and Cancer Screening Center.

== Notable scientists and other people from JFCR ==
- Mataro Nagayo, pathologist
- Takaoki Sasaki, oncologist
- Masaru Kuru, surgeon
- Tomizo Yoshida, discoverer of Yoshida Sarcoma
- Takashi Sugimura, biochemist
- Masahito, Prince Hitachi, cancer researcher and honorary president
- Kikuko, Princess Takamatsu, sponsor for JFCR

== See also ==
- Japanese Cancer Association
- Cancer Science
