= Cancer Science =

- Discipline: Oncology
- Language: English
- Edited by: Kohei Miyazono

Publication details
- Former name(s): Japanese Journal of Cancer Research, Gann
- History: 1907-present
- Publisher: Wiley-Blackwell on behalf of the Japanese Cancer Association
- Frequency: Monthly
- Impact factor: 6.716 (2020)

Standard abbreviations
- ISO 4: Cancer Sci.

Indexing
- CODEN: CSACCM
- ISSN: 1347-9032 (print); 1349-7006 (web)
- LCCN: 2003243167
- OCLC no.: 183261143

Links
- Journal homepage; Online access; Online archive

Cancer Science is a monthly peer-reviewed medical journal covering research in oncology, which is published by Wiley-Blackwell on behalf of the Japanese Cancer Association. Established in 1907, the journal publishes original articles, editorials, and letters to the editor, describing original research in the fields of basic, translational, and clinical cancer research. The editor-in-chief is Kohei Miyazono (University of Tokyo). According to the Journal Citation Reports, the journal has a 2020 impact factor of 6.71, ranking it 50 out of 242 journals in the category "Oncology".

== History ==
The journal was established in 1907 as the Japanese Journal of Cancer Research by Katsusaburō Yamagiwa (University of Tokyo), who first produced tumors in animals by painting tar on their skin. In 1908, he joined the Japanese Foundation for Cancer Research as the first president, and the journal became the official journal of the foundation. The journal was transferred to the Japanese Cancer Association in 1941 and able to continue its work throughout the Second World War. The name of the journal obtained its current name in 2003.

== Association awards ==
The "Cancer Science Young Scientists Award for researchers in Asia" was established for the development of young researchers from the Asian region in the area of cancer research.
