= Yamagiwa Katsusaburō =

Japanese medical scientist (1863–1930)

Yamagiwa Katsusaburō 山極 勝三郎
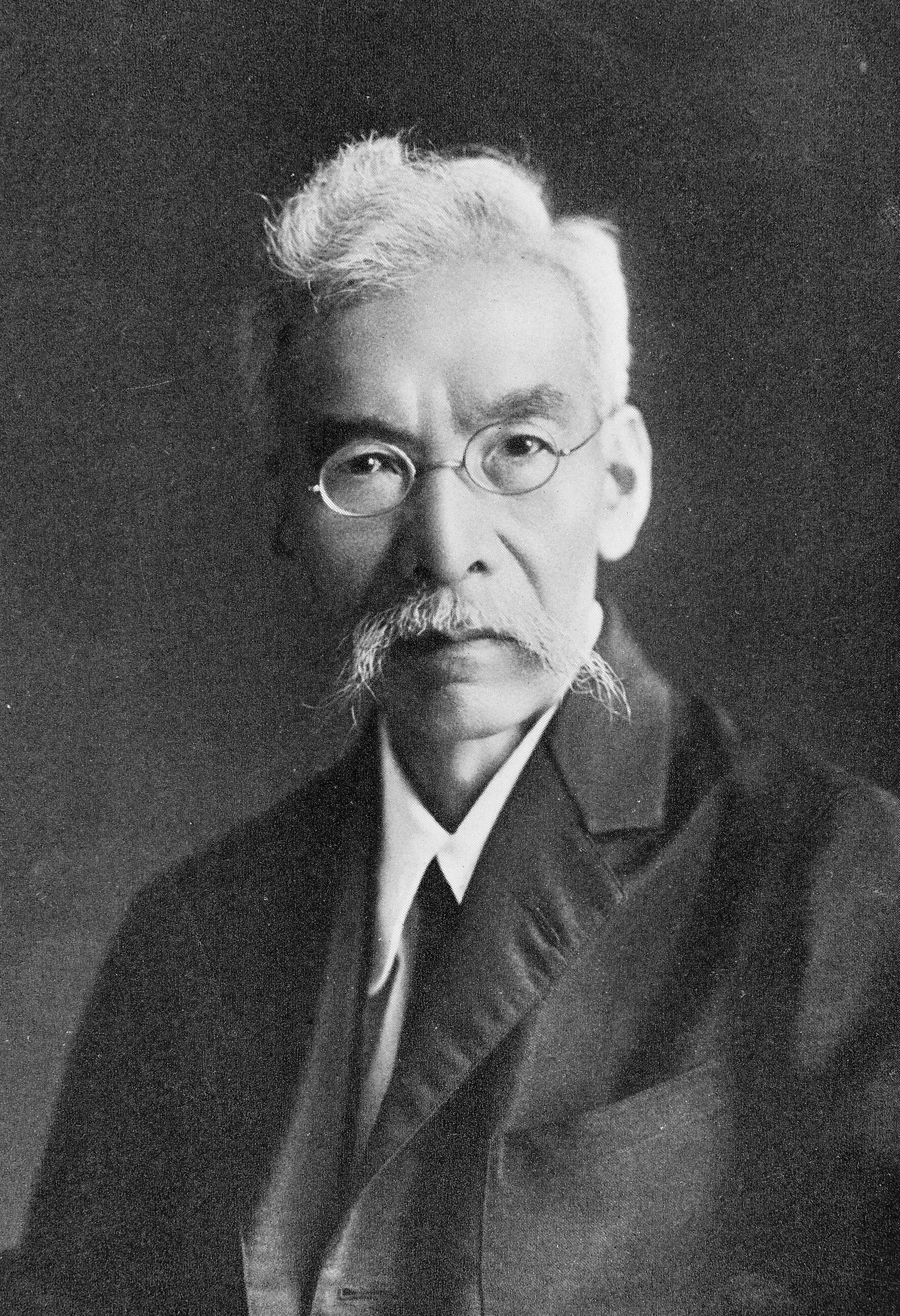
- Yamagiwa Katsusaburō
- Born: 23 February 1863; Ueda, Shinano Province (now Nagano Prefecture), Japan
- Died: 2 March 1930 (aged 67); Tokyo, Japan
- Education: Tokyo Imperial University
- Known for: Chemical carcinogenesis
- Awards: Japan Academy Prize, 1919
- Scientific career
- Fields: Pathology
- Workplaces: Tokyo Imperial University

Yamagiwa Katsusaburō (山極 勝三郎; 23 February 1863 – 2 March 1930) was a Japanese pathologist who carried out pioneering work into the causes of cancer, and was the first to demonstrate chemical carcinogenesis. He was a 7-time Nobel Prize nominee.

== Life ==
Yamagiwa was born in Ueda, Nagano, the third son of the feudal retainer of the Ueda Domain in Shinano Province. He became the adopted son-in-law of Yoshiya Yamagiwa, a physician in Katsuya, Tokyo, and took the surname Yamagiwa. He completed his MD in 1888 from Imperial University of Tokyo. He was appointed as a professor at the Medical School, Imperial University of Tokyo and published his landmark work, Byōri Sōron Kōgi, in 1895.

Yamagiwa extensively promoted cancer research in Japan. In 1907 Cancer Science, peer-reviewed medical journal covering research in oncology, was first issued by him. In addition, he and his colleagues found the Japanese Foundation for Cancer Research in 1908.

He died in Tokyo of pneumonia in 1930 at the age of 67.

== Contributions ==
In a series of experiments conducted in 1915, Yamagiwa and his assistant Kōichi Ichikawa (1888–1948) induced squamous cell carcinomas on the ears of rabbits using coal tar, demonstrating the latter's carcinogenic properties.

== Recognitions ==
Yamagiwa and Ichikawa shared the Japan Academy Prize in 1919 for their work.

The 1926 Nobel Prize went to Johannes Andreas Grib Fibiger, for his discovery of Spiroptera carcinoma, a microbial parasite which Fibiger claimed was the cause of cancer. This "finding" was discredited by other scientists shortly thereafter. In 1915, Katsusaburo Yamagiwa had successfully induced squamous cell carcinoma by painting crude coal tar on the inner surface of rabbits' ears. Yamagiwa's work has become the primary basis for this line of research. Because of this, some people consider Fibiger's Nobel Prize to be undeserved, particularly because Yamagiwa never received the prize for his work.

In 1966, the former committee member Folke Henschen advocated that Yamagiwa deserved the Nobel Prize, but it was not realized.
