= Japanese Cancer Association =

Japanese research organization

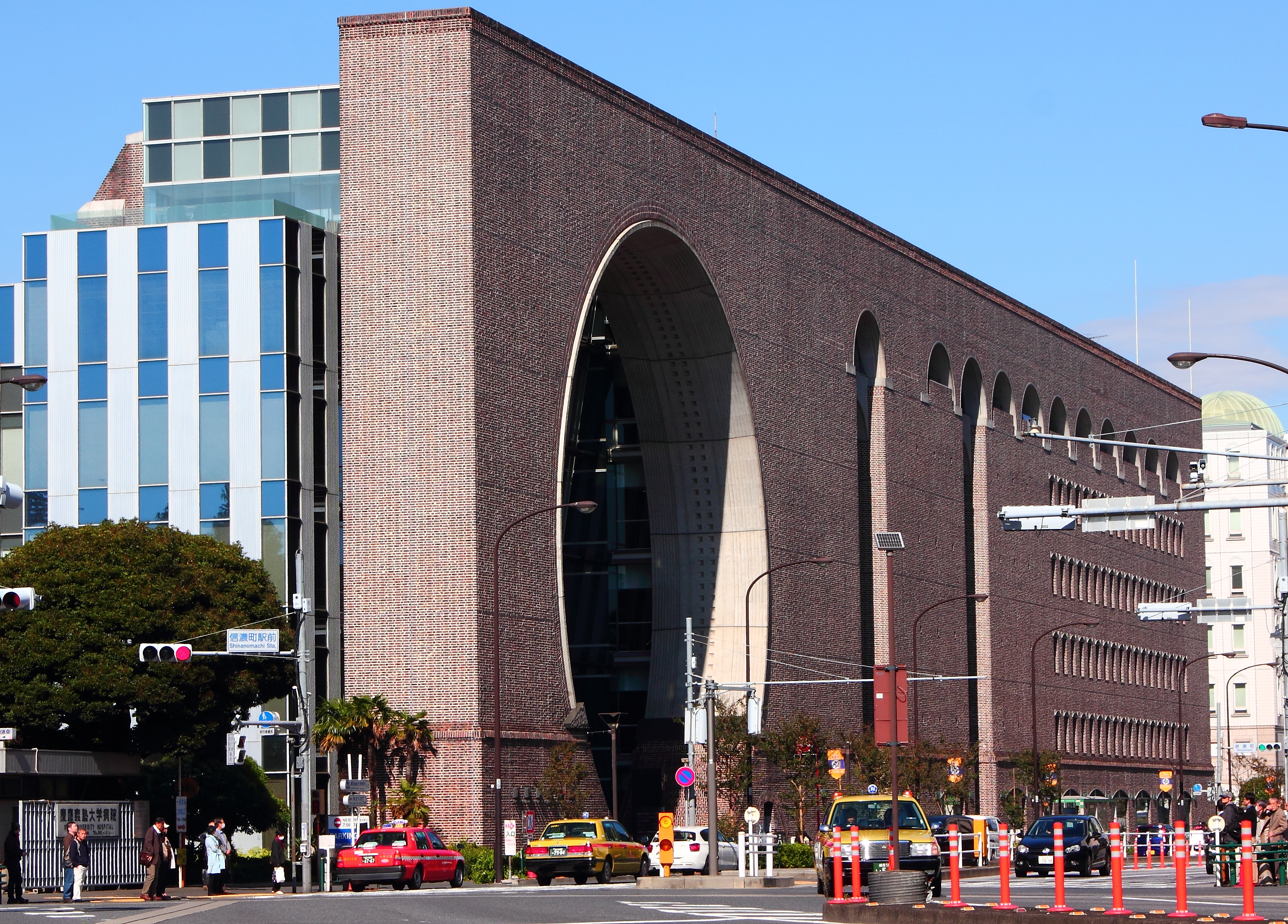
- headquarters in Tokyo
- Formation: April 5, 1941; 85 years ago
- Headquarters: Shinjuku, Tokyo, Japan
- Members: More than 16,000
- Official language: Japanese, English
- Website: www.jca.gr.jp/english/index.html

The Japanese Cancer Association (日本癌学会, Nihon Gan Gakkai) (JCA) is the oldest professional association related to cancer research in Japan. Based in Shinjuku, Tokyo, it focuses on all aspects of cancer research, including basic, clinical and translational research into the etiology, prevention, diagnosis, and treatment of cancer. Founded in 1941, the JCA has more than 16,000 members.

== Purpose and activities ==
The purpose of the JCA is to promote cancer research. It hosts an annual meeting and other academic meetings (such as symposiums and conferences once or twice a year), holds lectures open to the public, and publishes a journal.

The 72nd annual meeting of the Japanese Cancer Association was held at Pacifico Yokohama from October 3 to 5, 2013.

== History ==
In 1941, Mataro Nagayo, President of the Japanese Foundation for Cancer Research, proposed the foundation of a new organization related to cancer research, and the JCA was established and joined to the Japan Medical Society in the same year. The JCA became Union for International Cancer Control full member in 1968.

== Cancer Science ==
The JCA publishes a peer-reviewed and fully open access journal, Cancer Science. This monthly journal was first produced by Katsusaburō Yamagiwa, Japan's pioneer cancer researcher, in 1907. It publishes original articles describing original research in the fields of basic, translational, and clinical cancer research. It also accepts reports and case studies.

== Association awards ==
Academic awards established by the JCA include the following:

- Tomizo Yoshida Award
- Mataro Nagayo Award
- Japanese Cancer Association Incitement Award
- JCA-Mauvernay Award
- JCA-CHAAO Award
