= Institute of Medical Science (Japan) =

Medical research organization in Tokyo

Coordinates: 35°38′23.4″N 139°43′29.6″E

Institute of Medical Science, University of Tokyo
- 東京大学医科学研究所
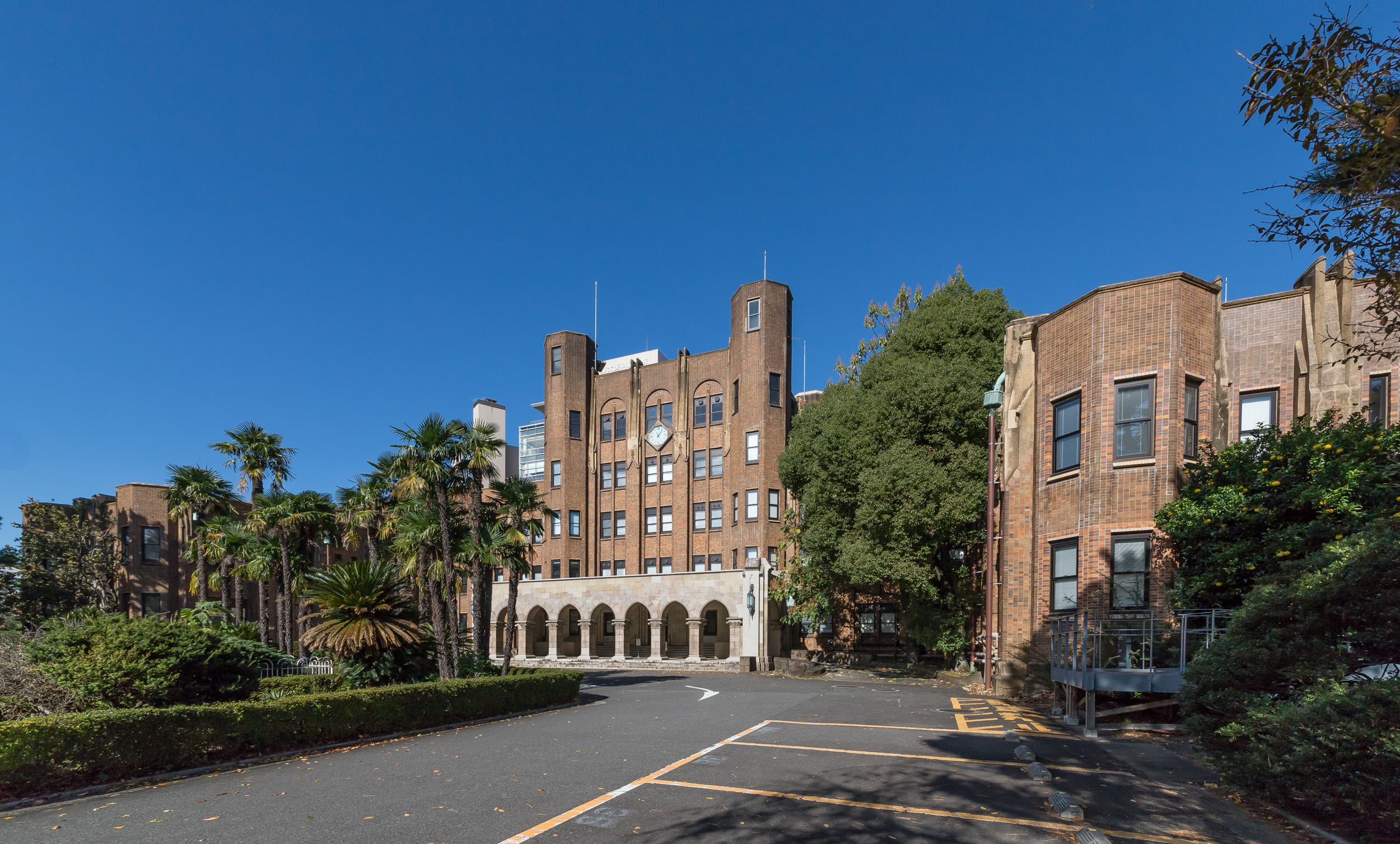
- Main building designed by Yoshikazu Uchida
- Abbreviation: ISMUT
- Formation: 1892
- Headquarters: Shirokane Campus, University of Tokyo; 1-6-4 Shirokanedai, Minato, Tokyo
- Leader: Makoto Nakanishi
- Budget: ￥17.6 b Yen

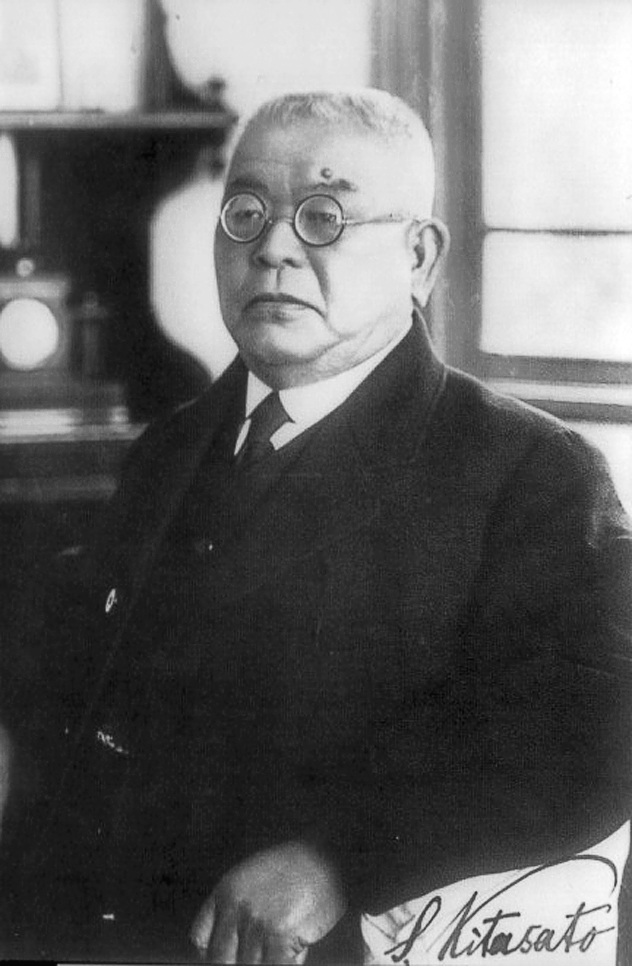
KITASATO Shibasaburō M.D., Ph.D.

The Institute of Medical Science (Tōkyō-daigaku Ikagaku Kenkyūjo 東京大学医科学研究所) is an ancillary establishment of the University of Tokyo. It succeeded the Institute of Infectious Diseases (伝染病研究所, Densenbyō Kenkyūjo) established in 1892 and is the foremost institute for medical and bioscience research in Japan.

A research hospital is attached to the institute. The former Institute of Public Health was located on the site.

== History ==
- 1892: Dainihon Shiritu Eiseikai Fuzoku Densenbyo Kenkyujyo (Empire of Japan Private Sanitation Meeting Attachment Institute of Infectious Diseases) was established.
- 1899: It became the National Institute of Infectious Diseases under the jurisdiction of the Ministry of the Interior.
- 1914: The institute entered under the management of the Ministry of Education).
- 1916: It becomes an ancillary establishment of Tokyo Imperial University.
- 1967: Densenbyo Kenkyujyo (Institute of Infectious Diseases) was reorganized, then, Ikagaku Kenkyu-jyo (Institute of Medical Science) was established.

== Organization ==
- Department of Microbiology and Immunology
- Department of Cancer Biology
- Department of Basic Medical Sciences
- Donation Laboratories
- Human Genome Center
- Center for Experimental Medicine
- The Advanced Clinical Research Center
- International Research Center for Infectious

== Research facilities ==
=== First Building ===
- Photographic Laboratory (Prof. Jun-ichiro Inoue)
- Research Hospital
- Administration Office Project Accounting Office
- Division of Molecular of Therapy (Prof. Arinobu Tojo)
- Division of Medical Data Processing Network System (Prof. Tetsuo Shimizu)
- Executive Project Coordination Office
- Department of Advanced Medical Science (Prof. Naohide Yamashita)
- Division of Infectious Diseases (Prof. Aikichi Iwamoto)
- Division of Biochemistry (Associate Prof. Seiichi Takasaki)
- Library
- Director's Office (Prof. Naohide Yamashita)
- Dean's Office (Prof. Motoharu Seiki)
- Division of Bioengineering (Prof. Hideaki Tahara)
- Division of Cellular Therapy (Associate Prof. Kohichiro Tsuji)
- Division of Cellular Therapy (Prof. Toshio Kitamura)
- Research Hospital

=== Second Building ===
- Laboratory of Social Genome Sciences (Prof. Ichizo Kobayashi)
- Division of Fine Morphology (Prof. Eisaku Katayama)

=== Third Building ===
- Laboratory of Molecular Genetics (Prof. Izumu Saito)
- Division of Oncology (Prof. Tadashi Yamamoto)
- Laboratory of Functional Genomics (Prof. Sumio Sugano)
- Division of Neuronal Network (Prof. Toshiya Manabe)
- Department of Infectious Disease Control (Division of Microbial Infection) (Prof. Tetsuro Matano)
- Department of Infectious Disease Control (Division of Viral Infection) (Associate Prof. Yasushi Kawaguchi)
- Department of Infectious Disease Control (Division of Bacterial Infection) (Associate Prof. Ichiro Nakagawa)
- B Common Laboratory (Prof. Chieko Kai)
- Culture Media Section (Prof. Jun-ichiro Inoue)

=== Fourth Building ===
- Division of Molecular Pathology (Prof. Yoshinori Murakami)
- Division of Clinical Immunology (Prof. Chikao Morimoto)
- Laboratory of Cell Biology (Prof. Yoichiro Iwakura)
- Division of Host-Parasite Interaction (Prof. Hideo Iba)
- Division of Infectious Genetics (Prof. Kensuke Miyake)
- Radioisotope laboratories (Prof. IWAKURA Yoichiro Iwakura)
- Radioisotope laboratories

=== Clinical Research Building A ===
- Division of Cell Processing (CERES) ((Visiting) Prof. Tsuneo Takahashi)
- Cord blood bank

=== Clinical Research Building B ===
- Div. Hematopoietic Factors Chugai (Head: Toshio Kitamura)

=== Open Laboratory Building ===
- Division of Molecular and Developmental Biology (Oriental･Tomy･Softbank) (Prof.(Visiting) Sumiko Watanabe)
- Division of Stem Cell Engineering (Tooth Regeneration) (Prof. (Visiting) Minoru Ueda)
- Division of Exploratory Research (Ain Pharmaciez) (Associate Prof. (Visiting) Masahiro Kami)

=== General Research Building ===
- Laboratory of DNA Information Analysis (Prof. Satoru Miyano)
- Laboratory of Molecular Medicine (Prof. Yusuke Nakamura)
- Laboratory of Functional Analysis in silico (Prof. Kenta Nakai)
- Laboratory of Genome Technology (Associate Prof. Toyomasa Katagiri)
- Division of Cancer Cell Research (Prof. Motoharu Seiki)
- Division of Molecular Biology (Prof. Yoshikazu Nakamura)
- Division of Mucosal Immunology (Prof. Hiroshi Kiyono)
- Division of Molecular Cell Signaling (Prof. Haruo Saito)
- Division of Bacterial Infection (Prof. Chihiro Sasakawa)
- Division of Virology (Prof. Yoshihiro Kawaoka)
- Pathogenic Microbes Repository Unit (Prof. Chihiro Sasakawa)
- Laboratory Animal Research Center (Prof. Chieko Kai)
- Laboratory of Stem Cell Therapy (Prof. Hiromitsu Nakauchi)
- Division of Cellular and Molecular Biology (Prof. Jun-ichiro Inoue)
- Laboratory of Gene Expression and Regulation (Prof. Nobuaki Yoshida)

=== Human Genome Center ===
- Laboratory of Genome Database (Prof. Minoru Kanehisa)
- Laboratory of Sequence Analysis
- Department of Public Policy (Associate Prof. Kaori Mutou)
- Laboratory of Functional Genomics (Prof. Mark Lathrop, Associate Prof. Masao Nagasaki)
- RIKEN SNP Research Center
- Radioisotope Control Room Super Computer Room
- Radioisotope laboratories (Human Genome Center) (Prof. Yusuke Nakamura)
- Radioisotope Laboratory

=== Human Genome Center (annex) ===
Animal Center
Its gross area is 3,800 m^{2}

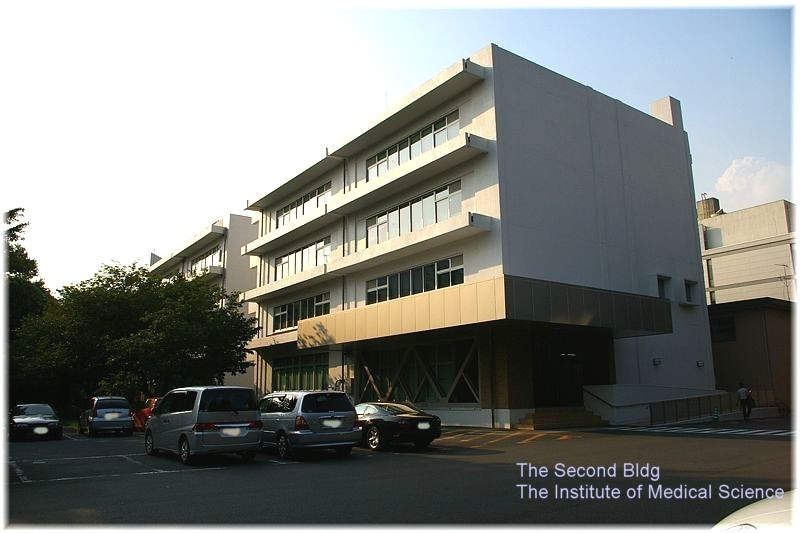
Second Building

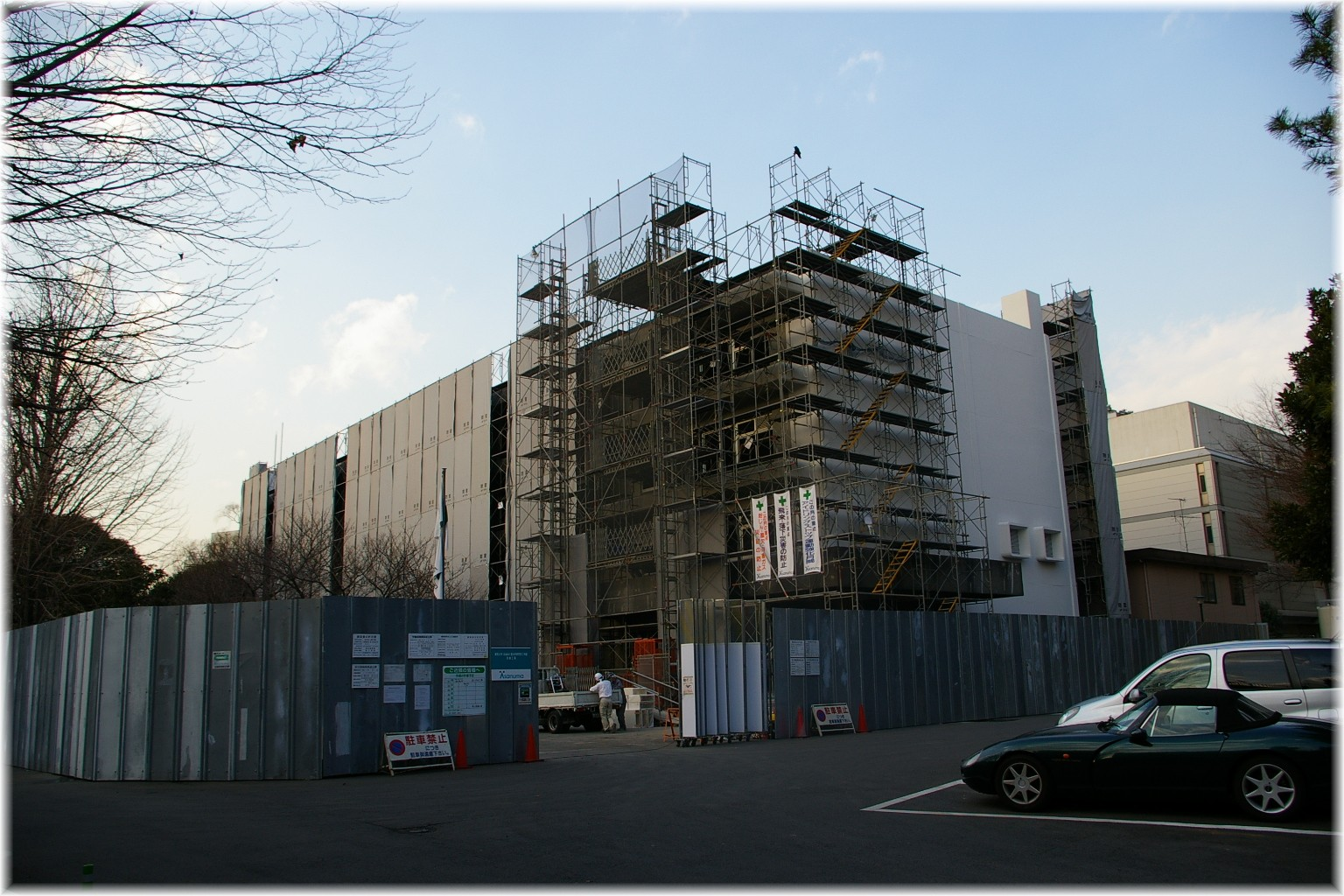
Second Building

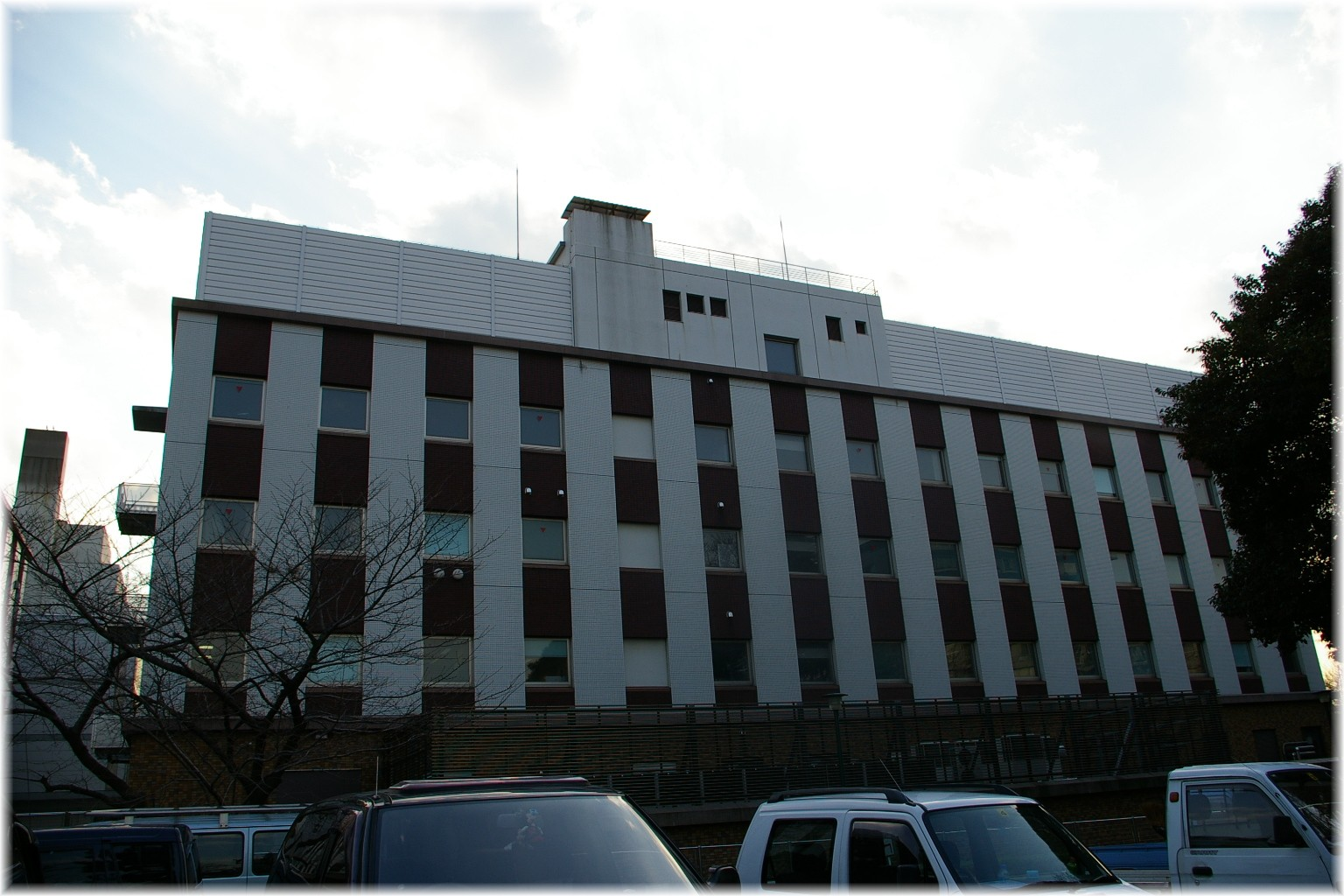
Third Building

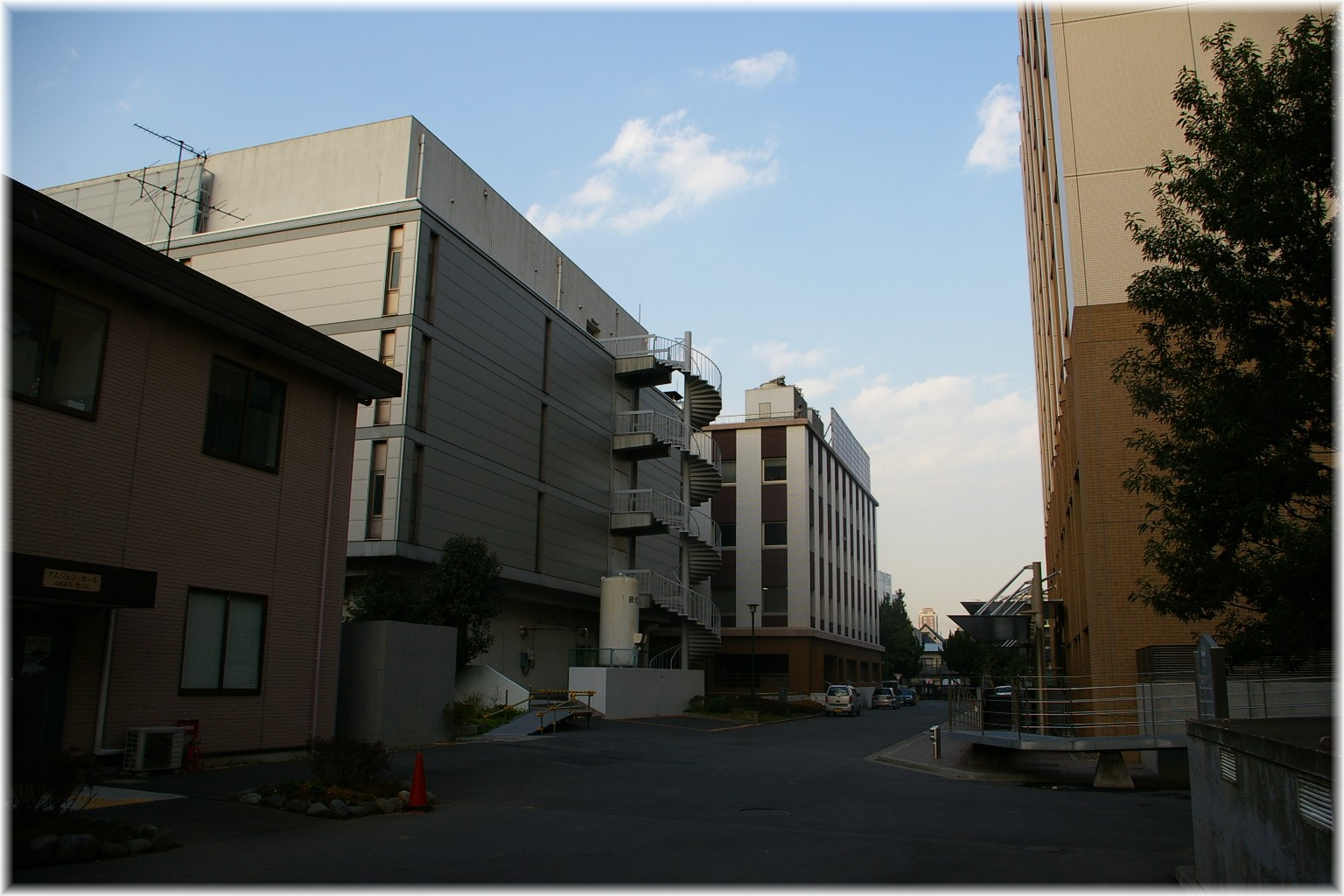
Animal Center

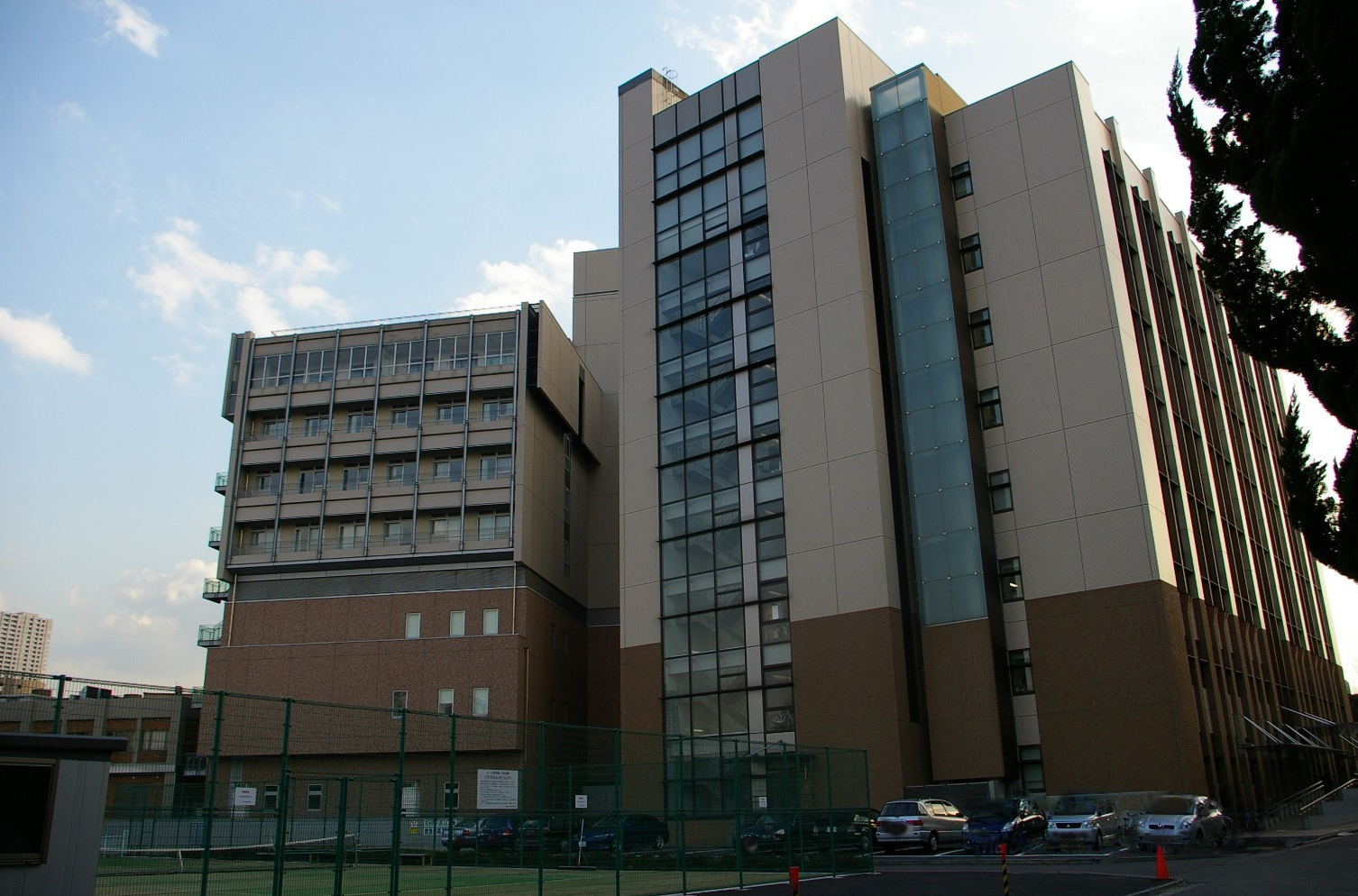
General Research Building

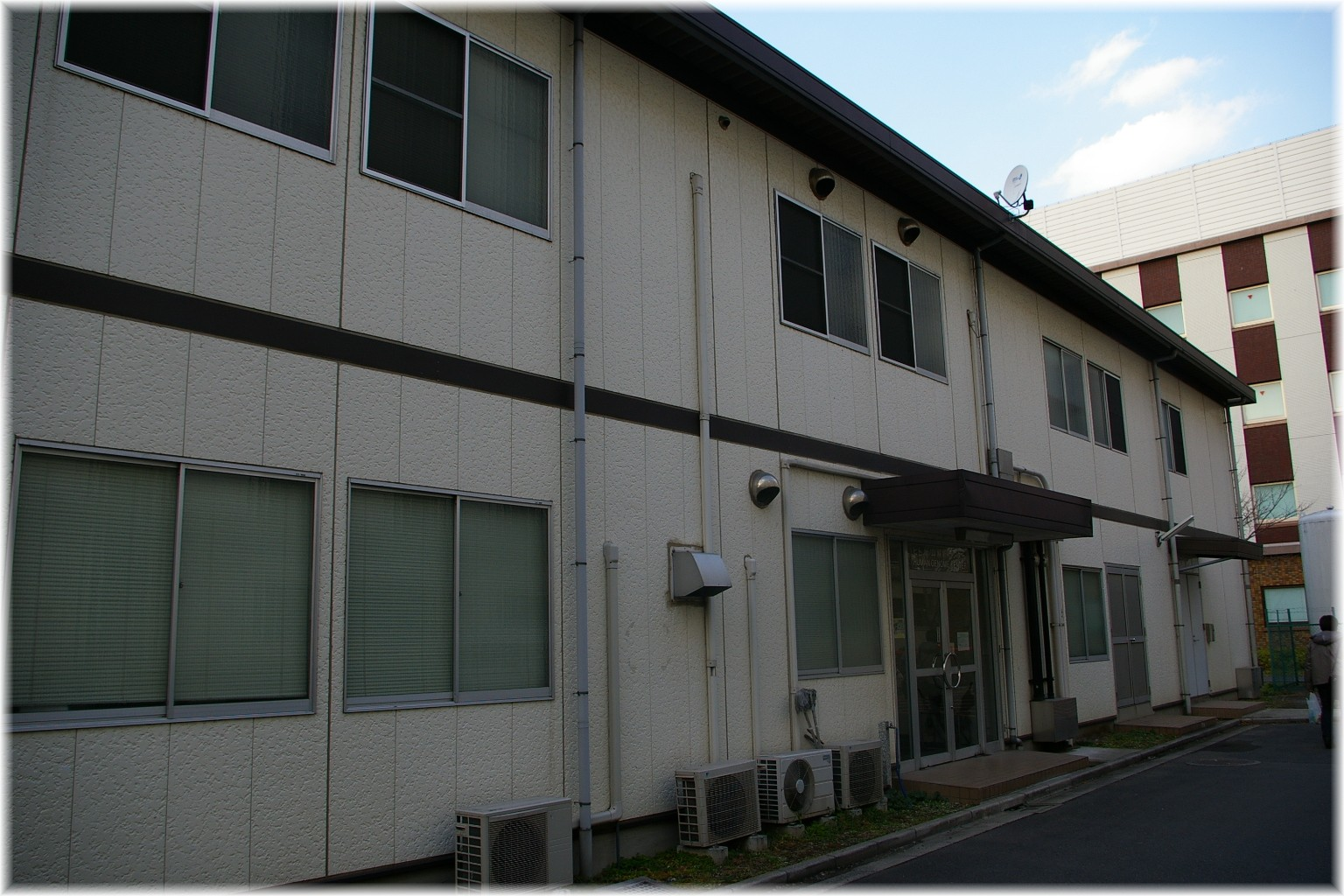
Human Genome Center

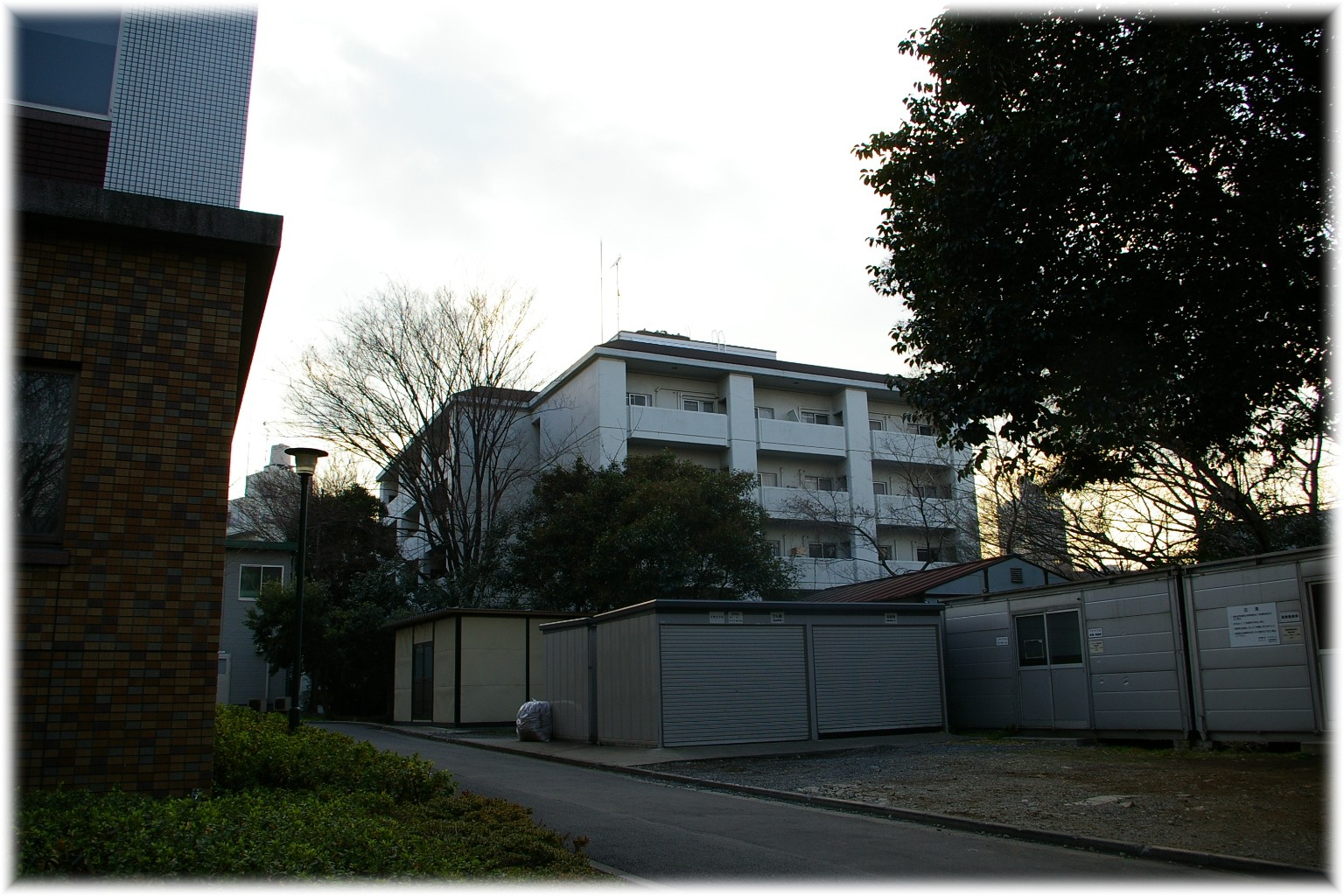
International Hall

== Clinical center ==
Hospital Building A (New Hospital Building)
Hospital Building B (Clinical Center)
Surgical Center Medical Supply Center
Cell Processing and Transfusion Dialysis room Applied Genomics
Laboratory Medicine
Hospital Building C (MRI Facility)

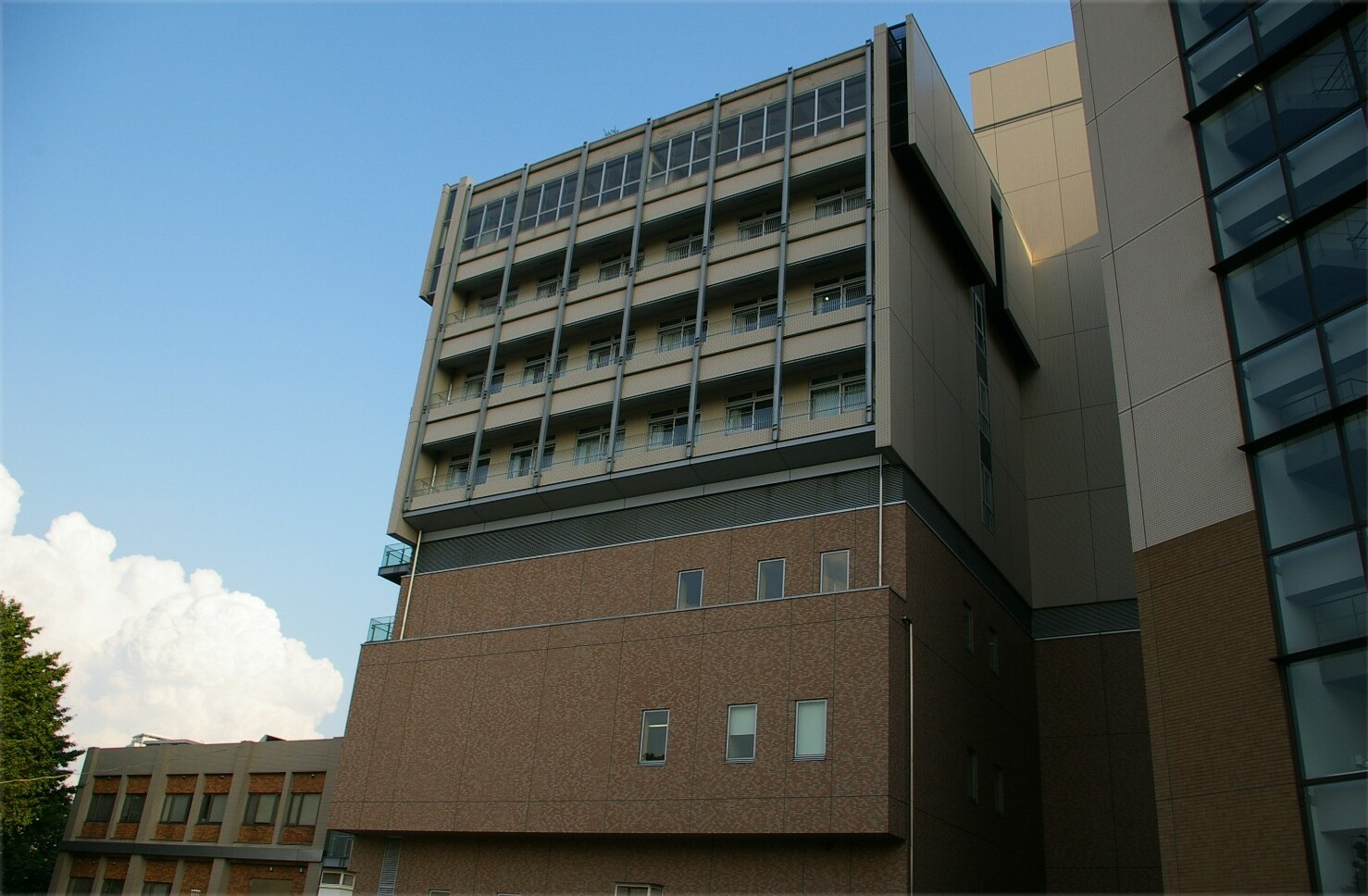
Hospital Building A

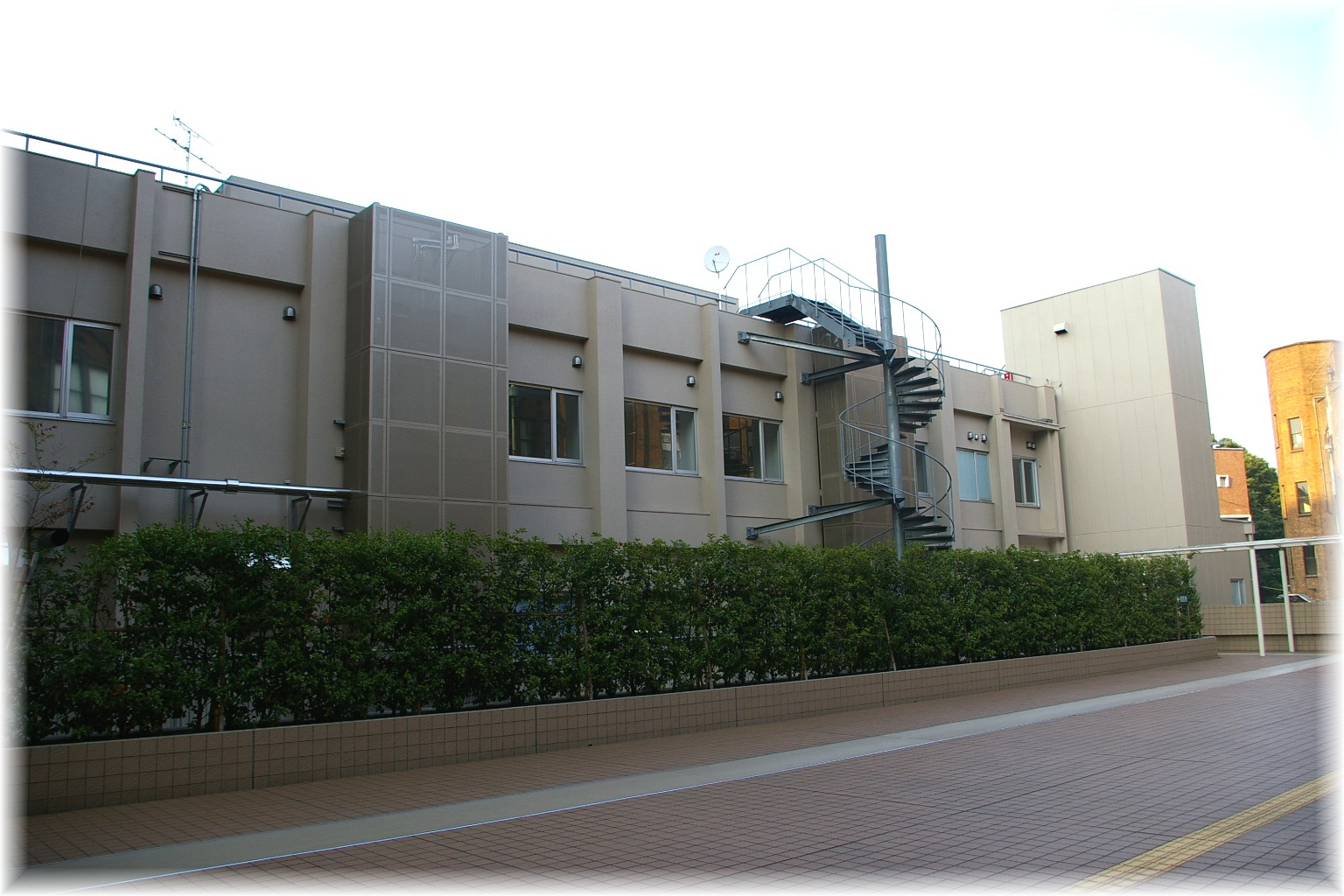
Hospital Building B (Clinical Center)

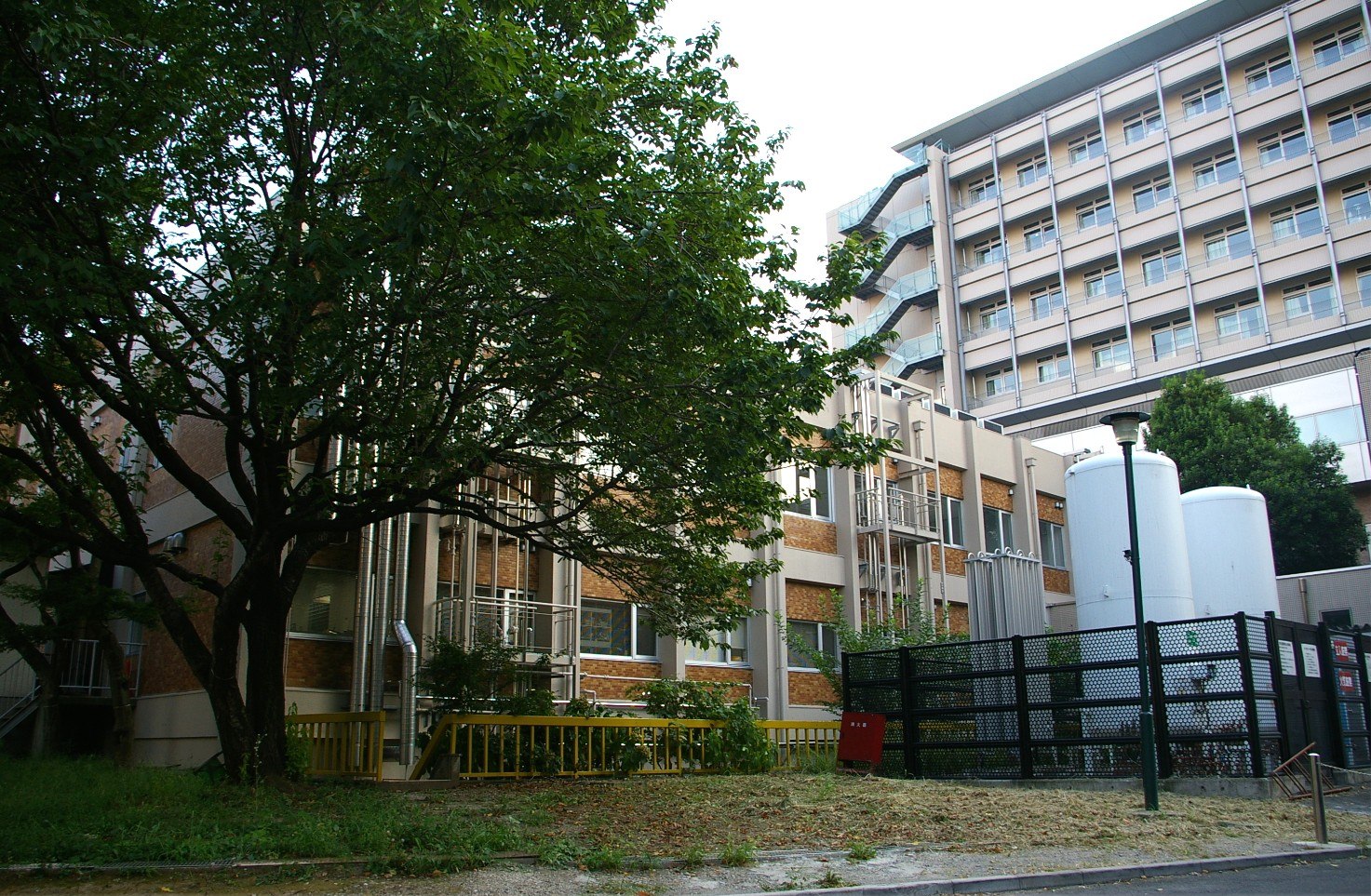
Hospital Building C (MRI Facility)

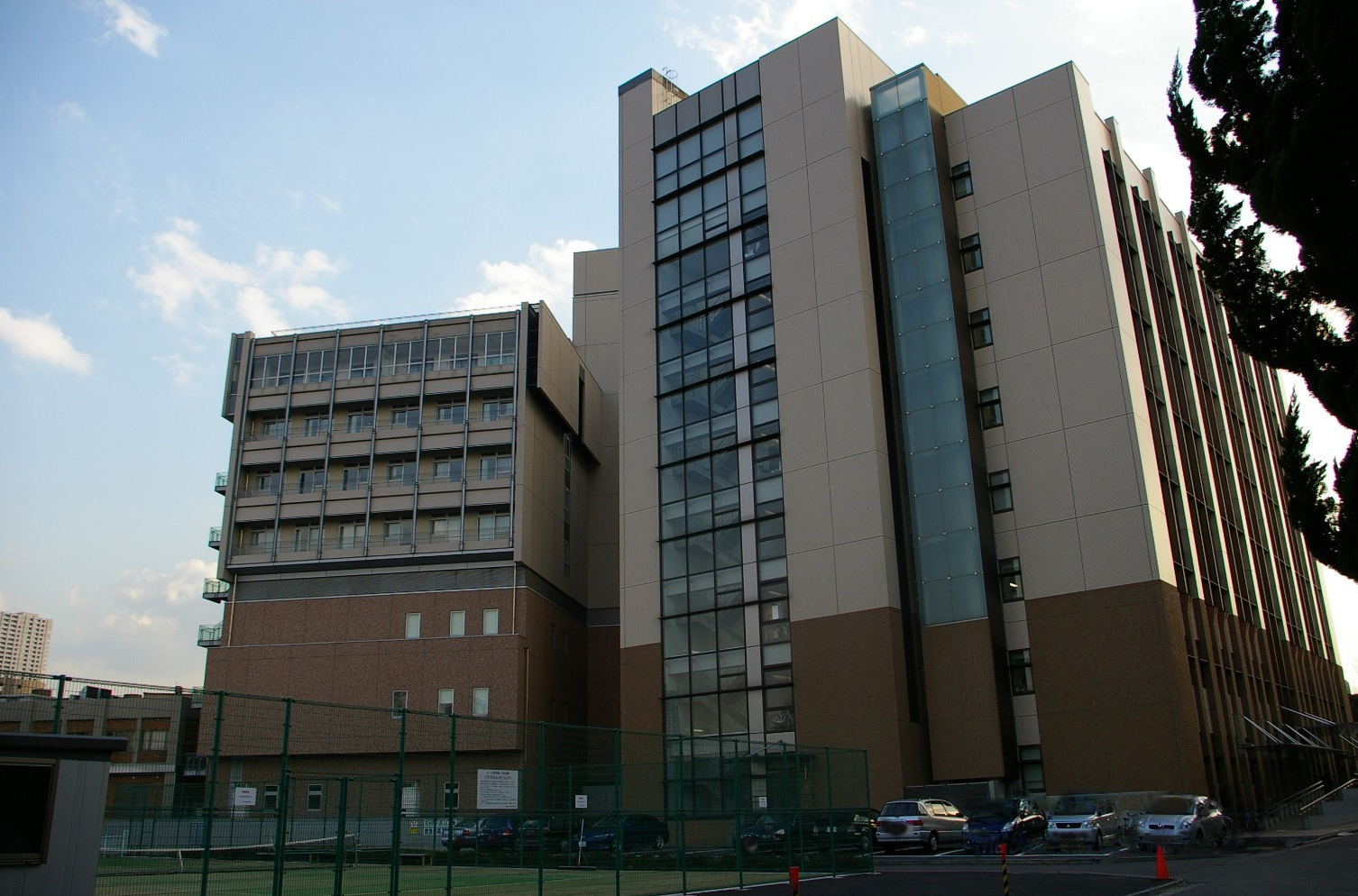
General Research Building and Hospital Building A

== Adjunct facilities ==
Amgen Hall
This structure was donated from Amgen to the Institute of Medical Science to support medical science research. It contains a main conference room, a smaller conference room, and a laboratory for Tumor Cell Biology (Prof. Toshiki Watanabe)
Crest Hall
International Hall
Shirokane Hall
In 1999, the house for the co-op (生協, Sheikyō) was remade into Shirokane Hall.
Medical Science Museum

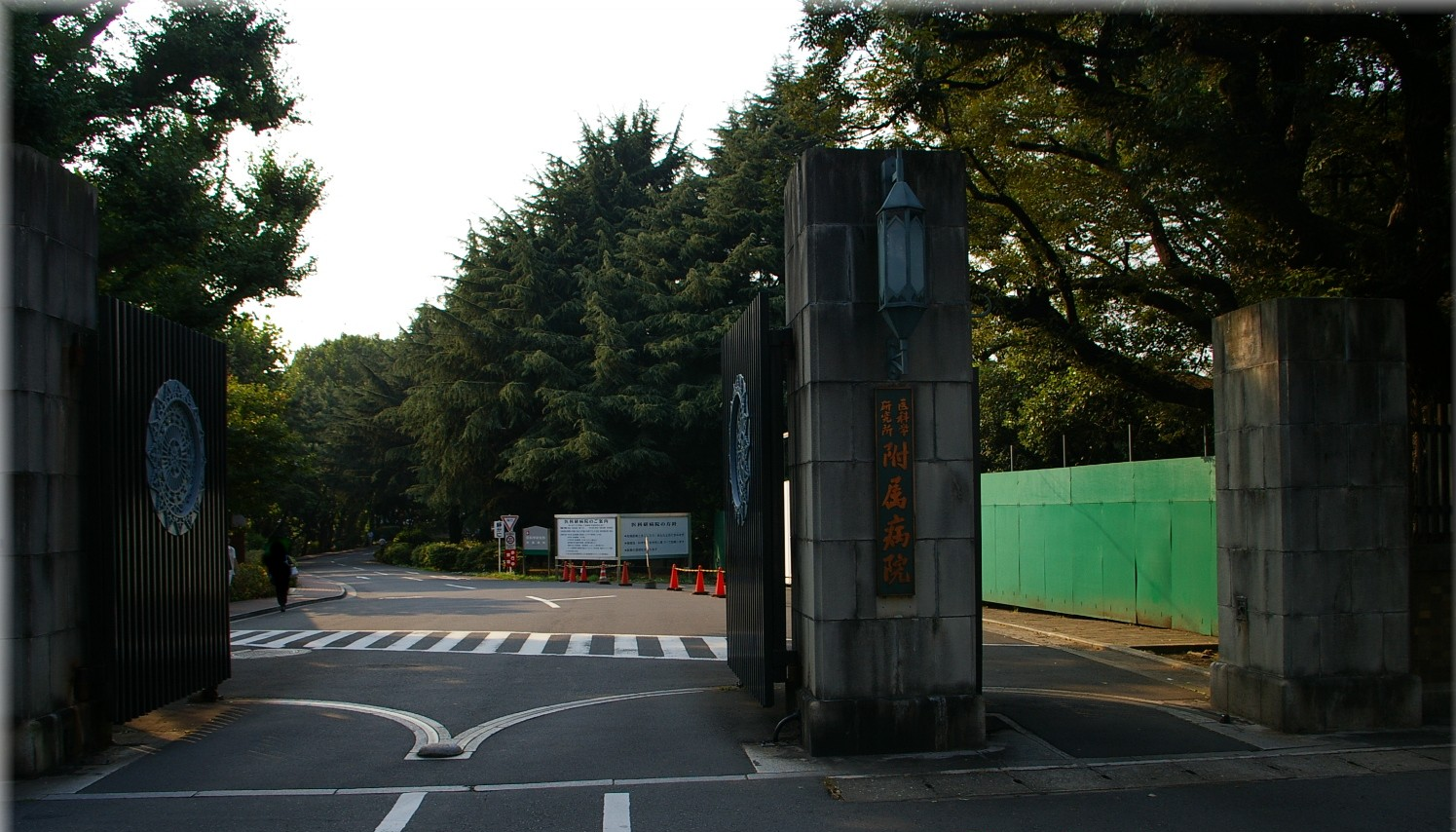
The main entrance

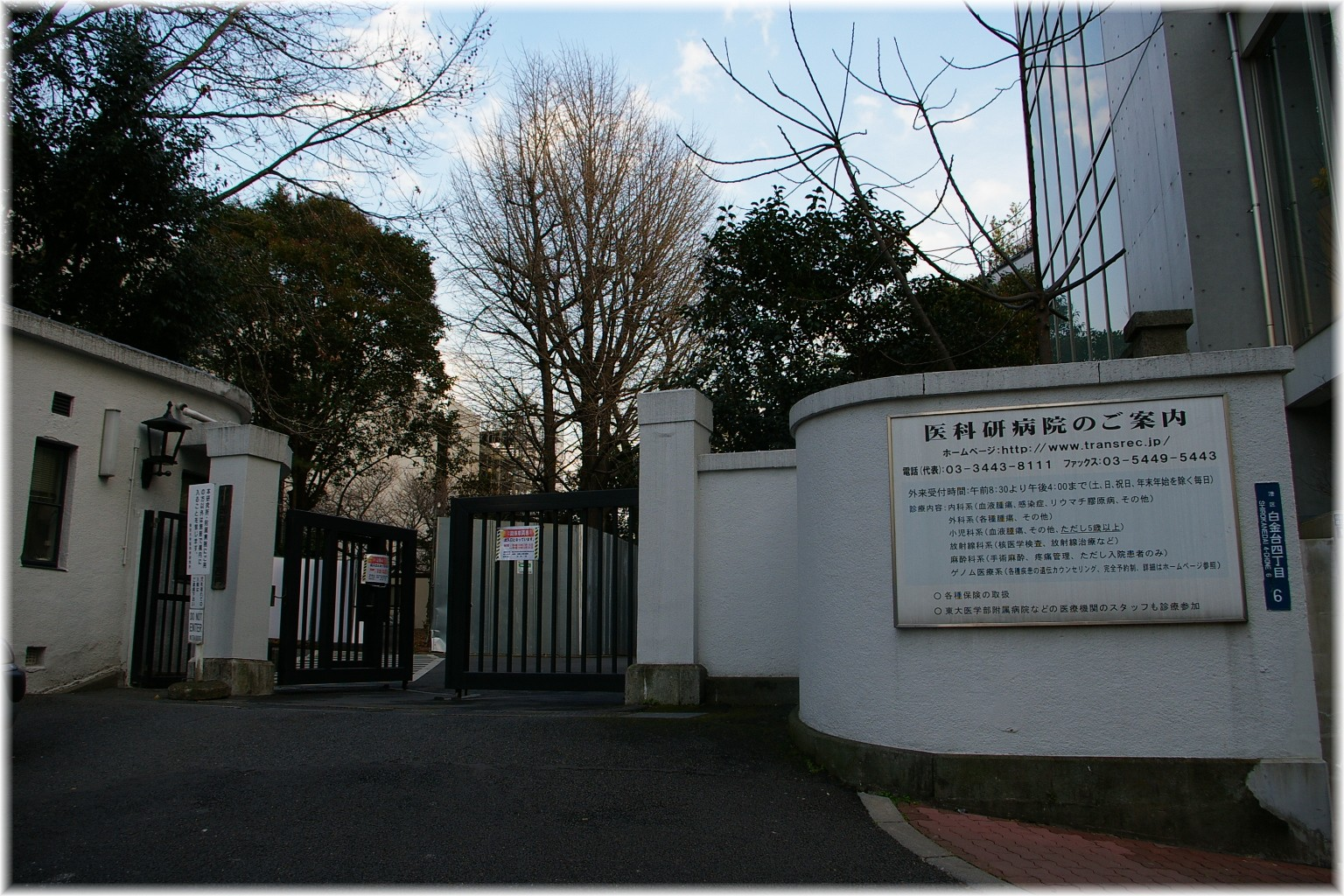
Entrance which faced "Plachina dori".

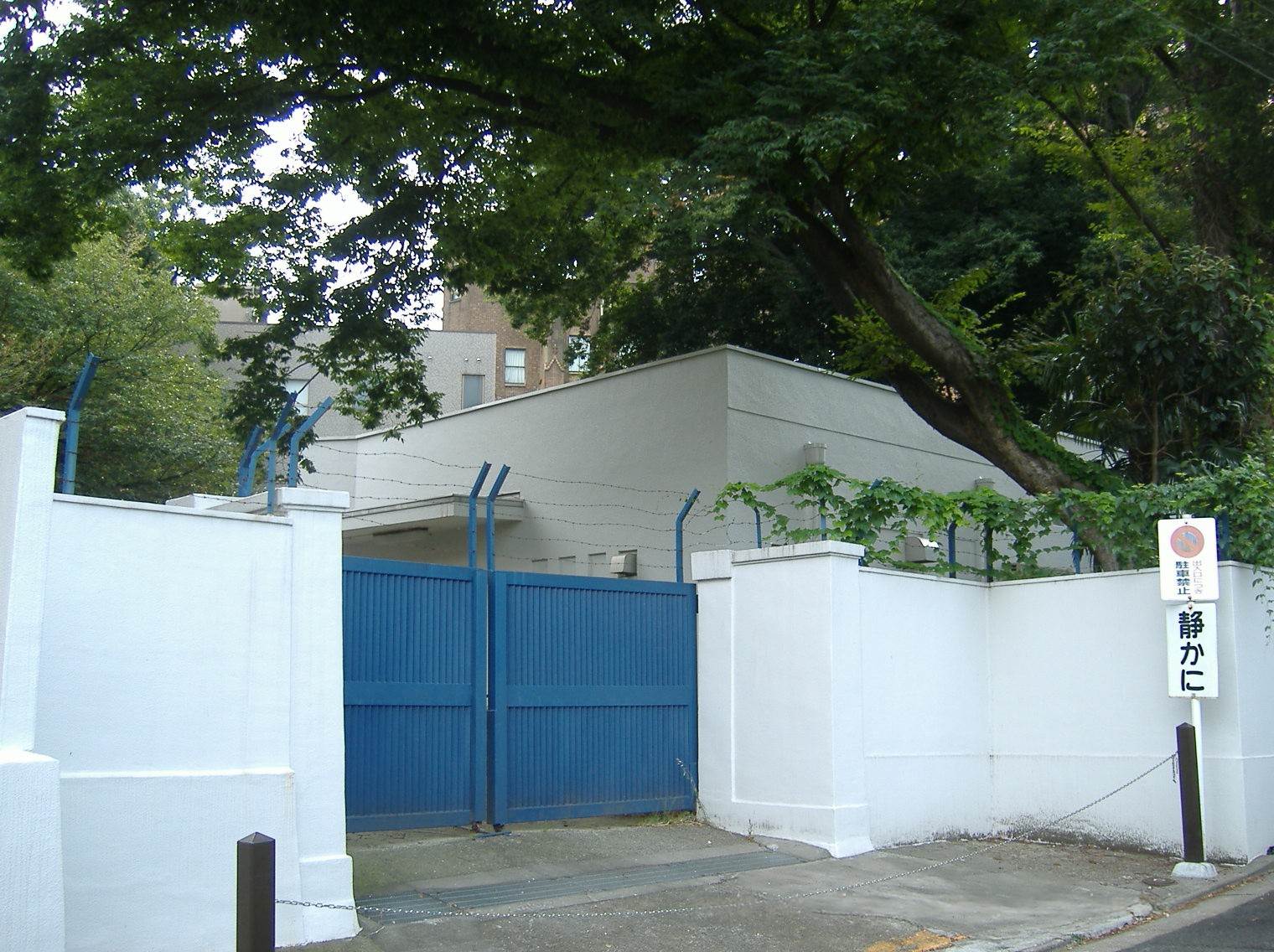
North gate
(usually shut.)

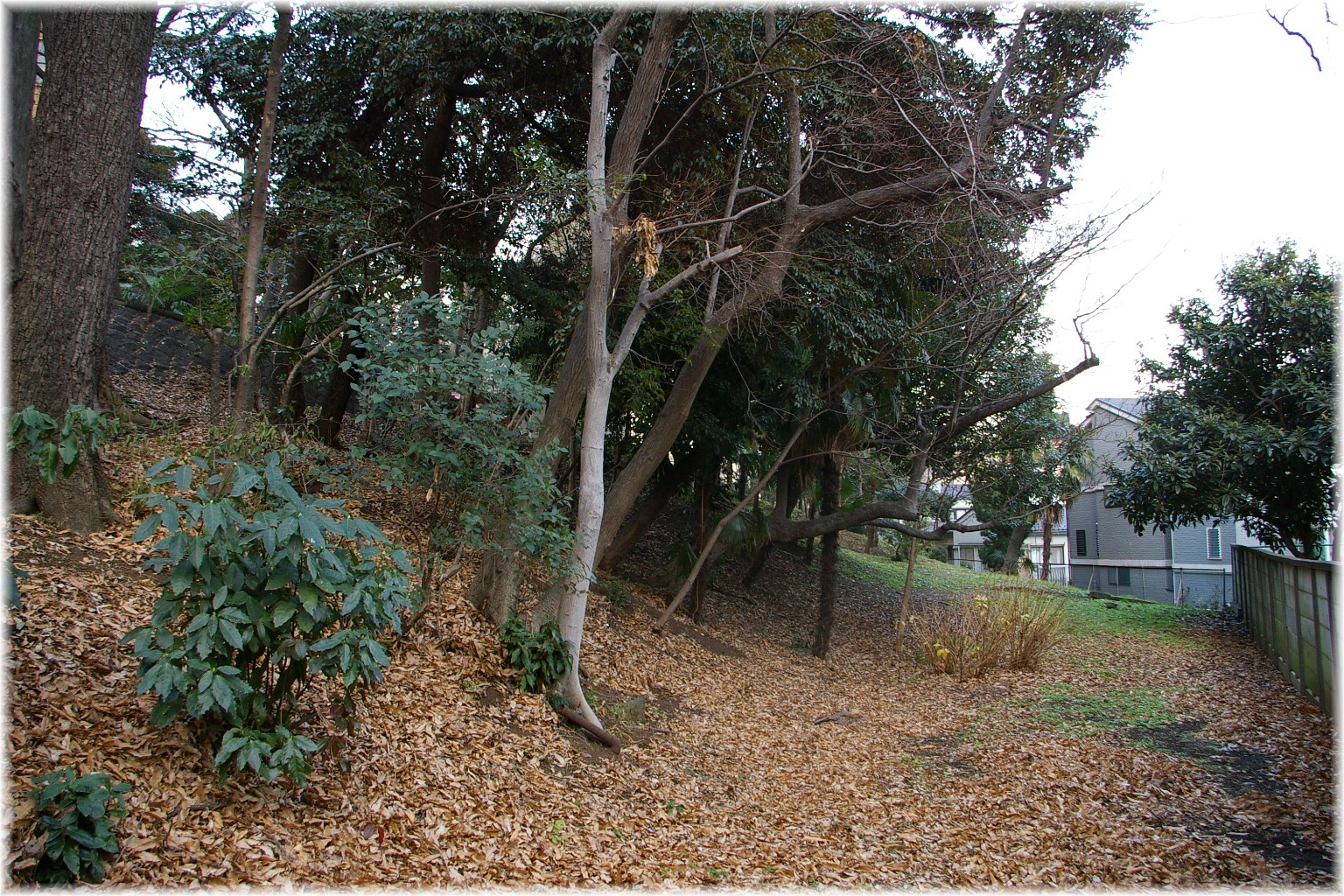
Garden

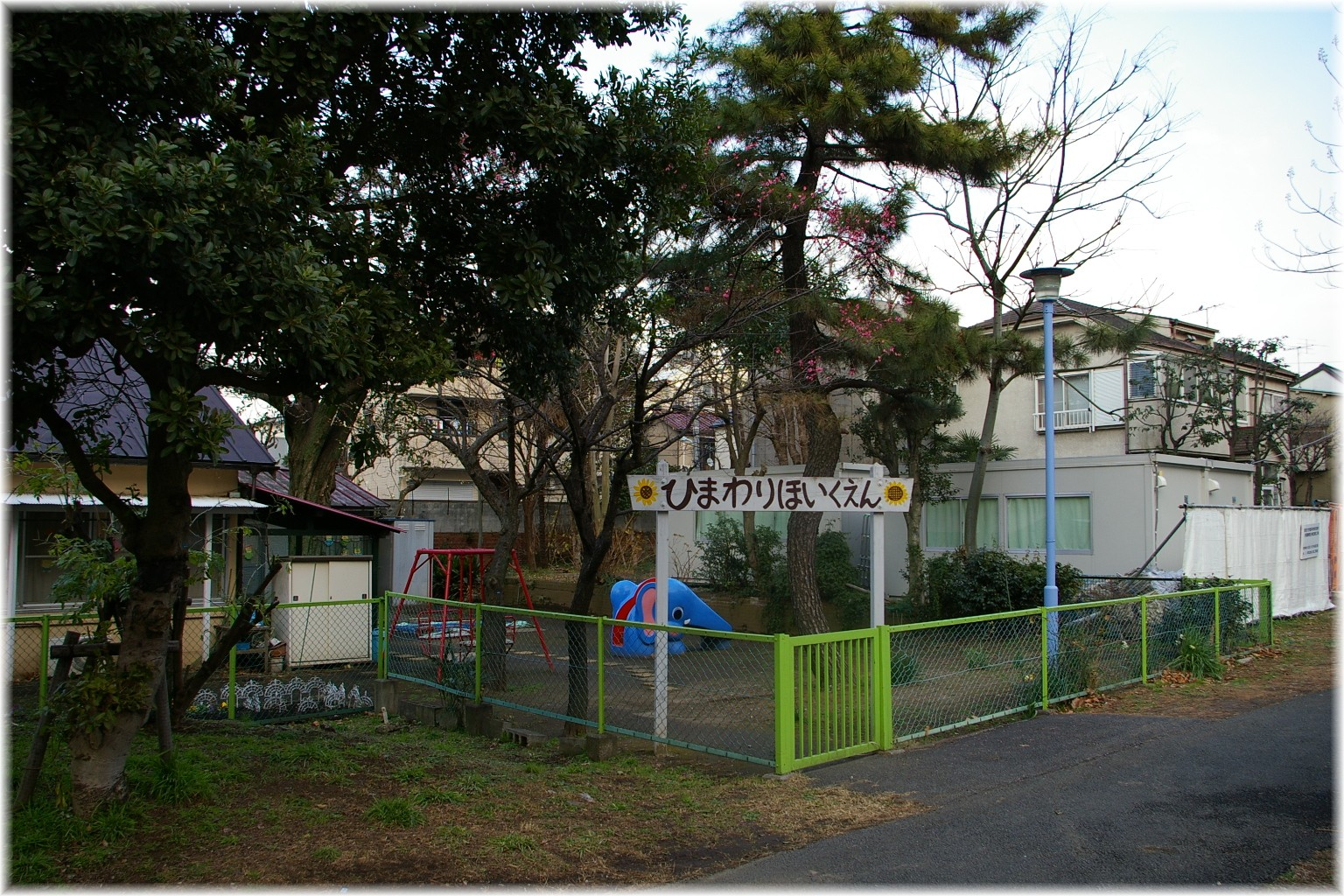
Kindergarten for children of staff member

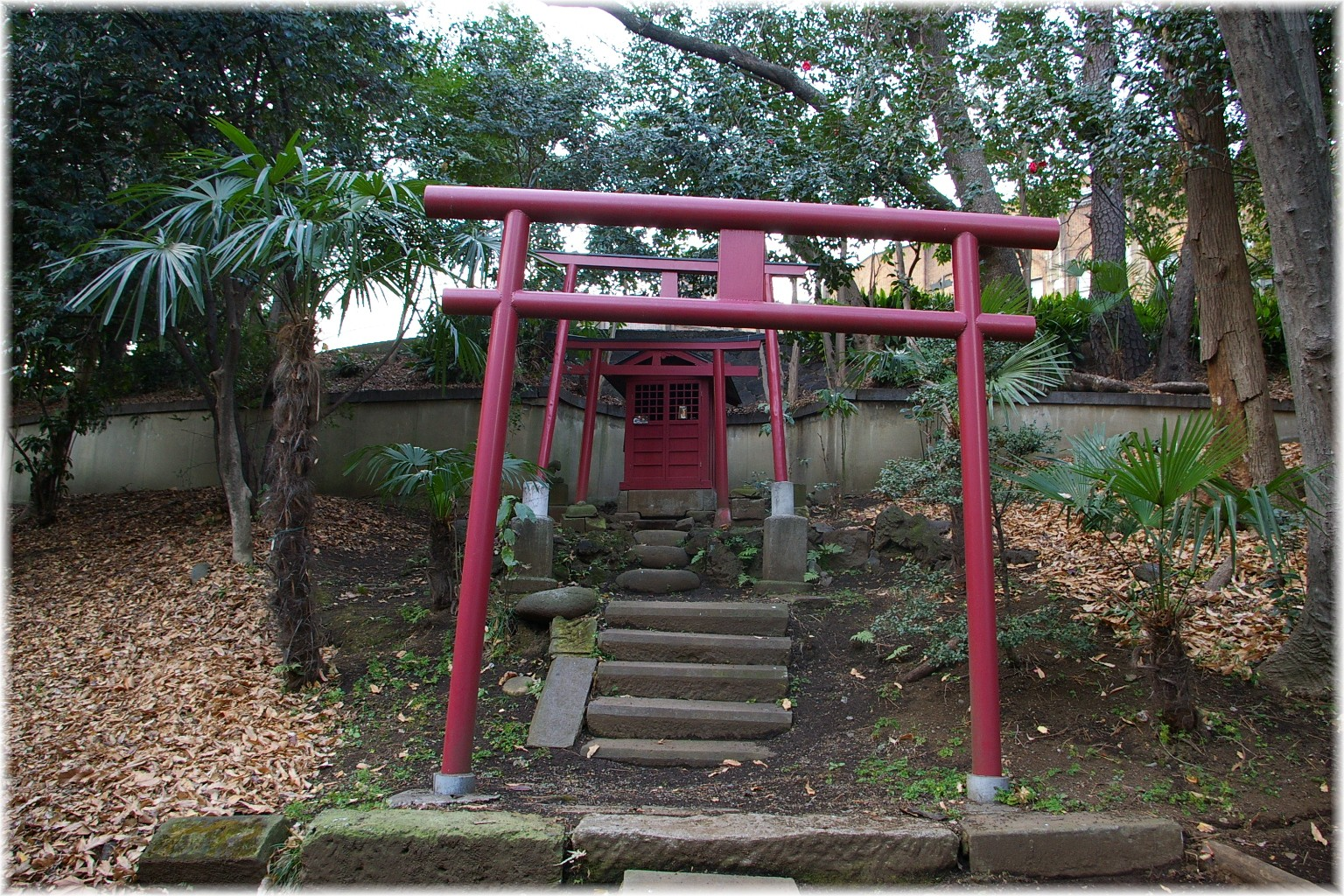
Shrine (御宮, Omiya)

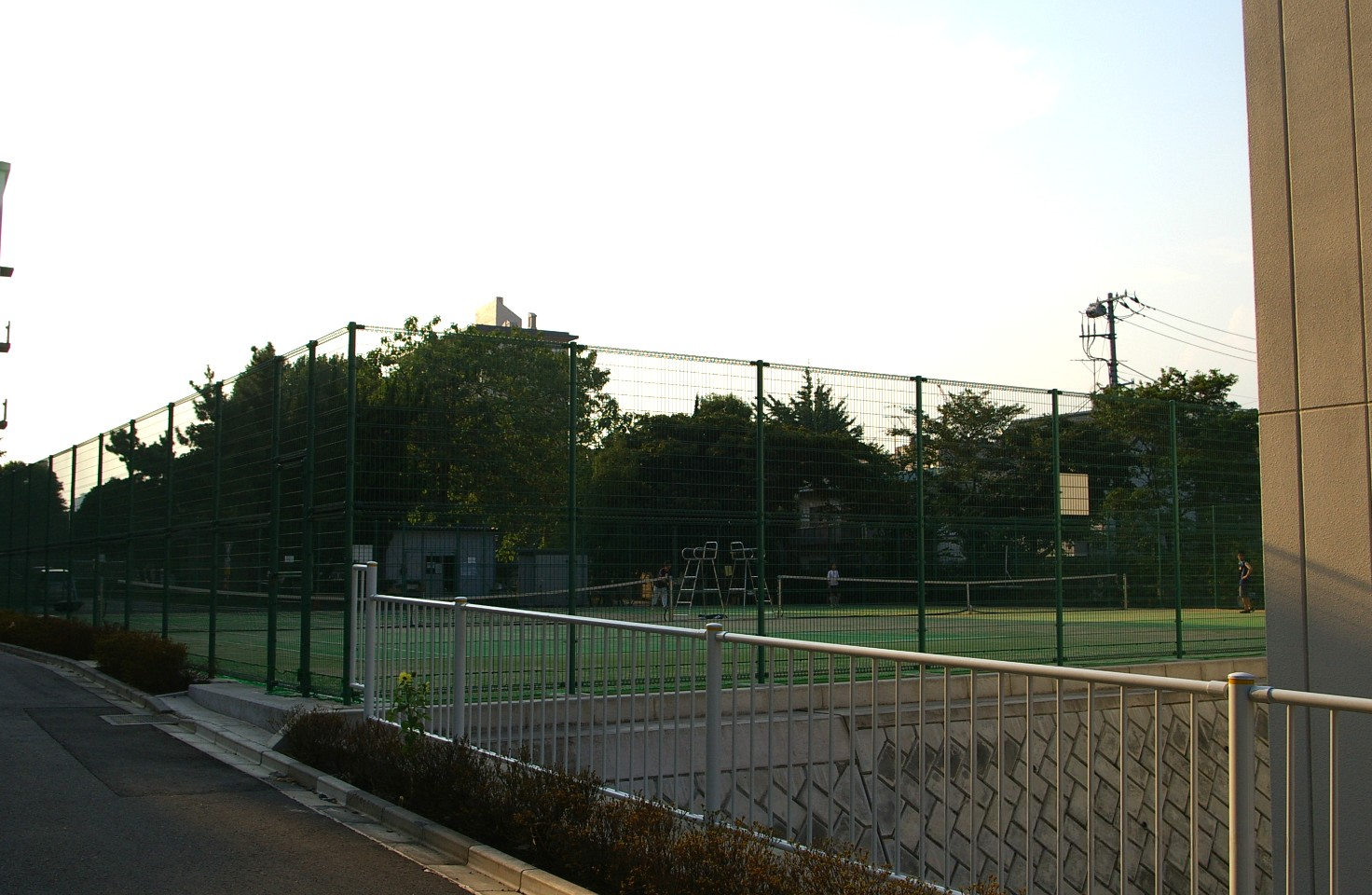
Tennis court

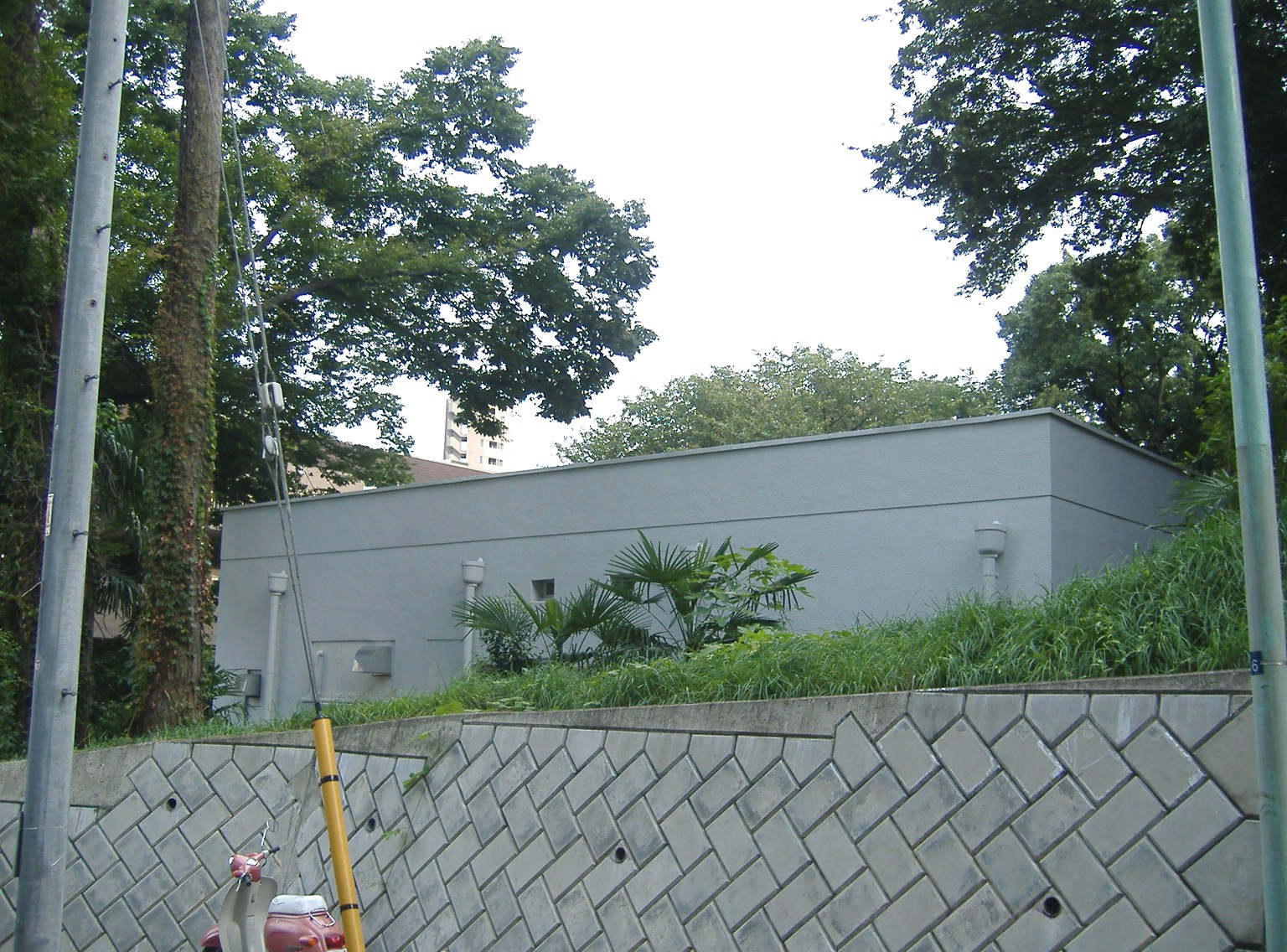
lich-house

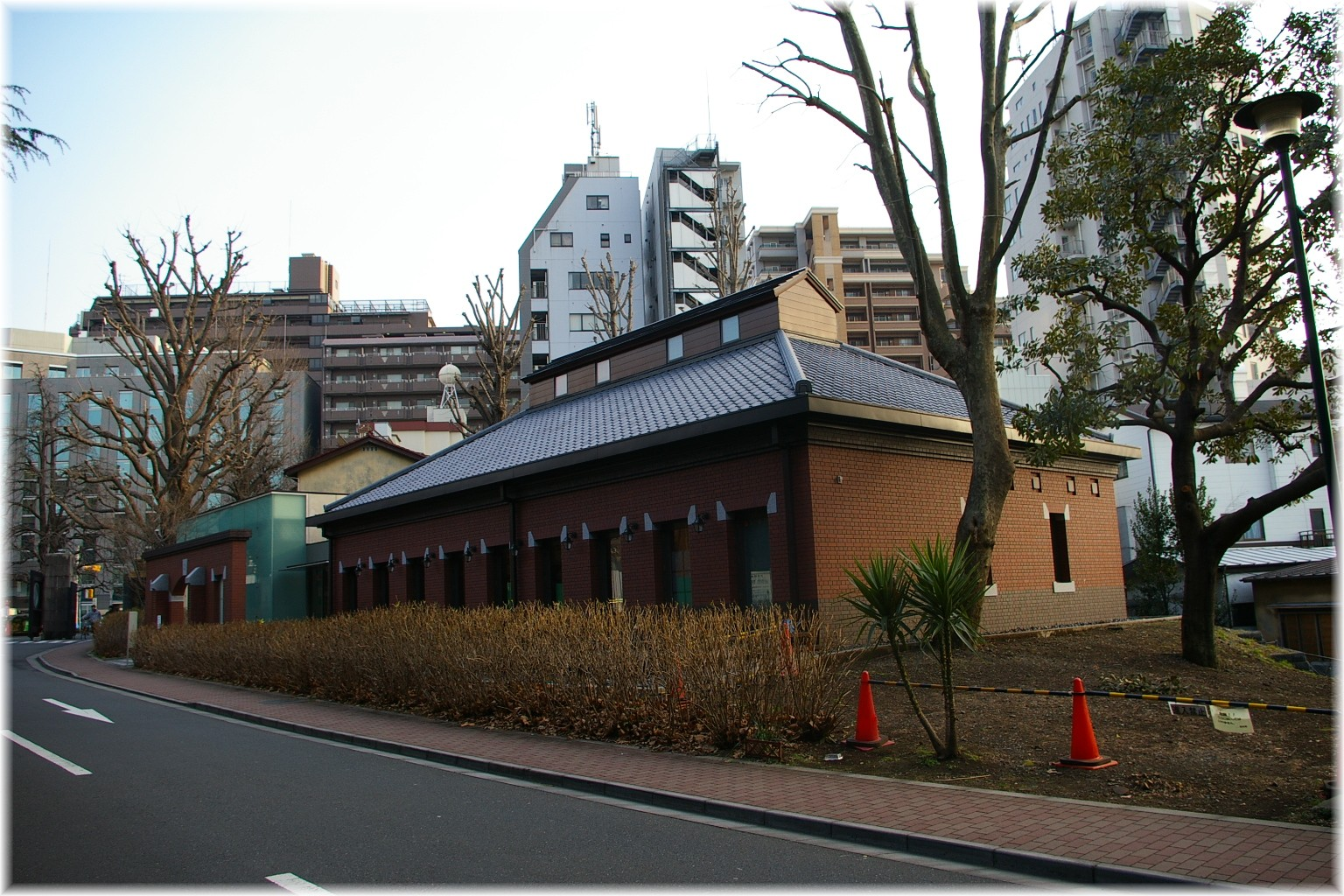
Medical Science Museum

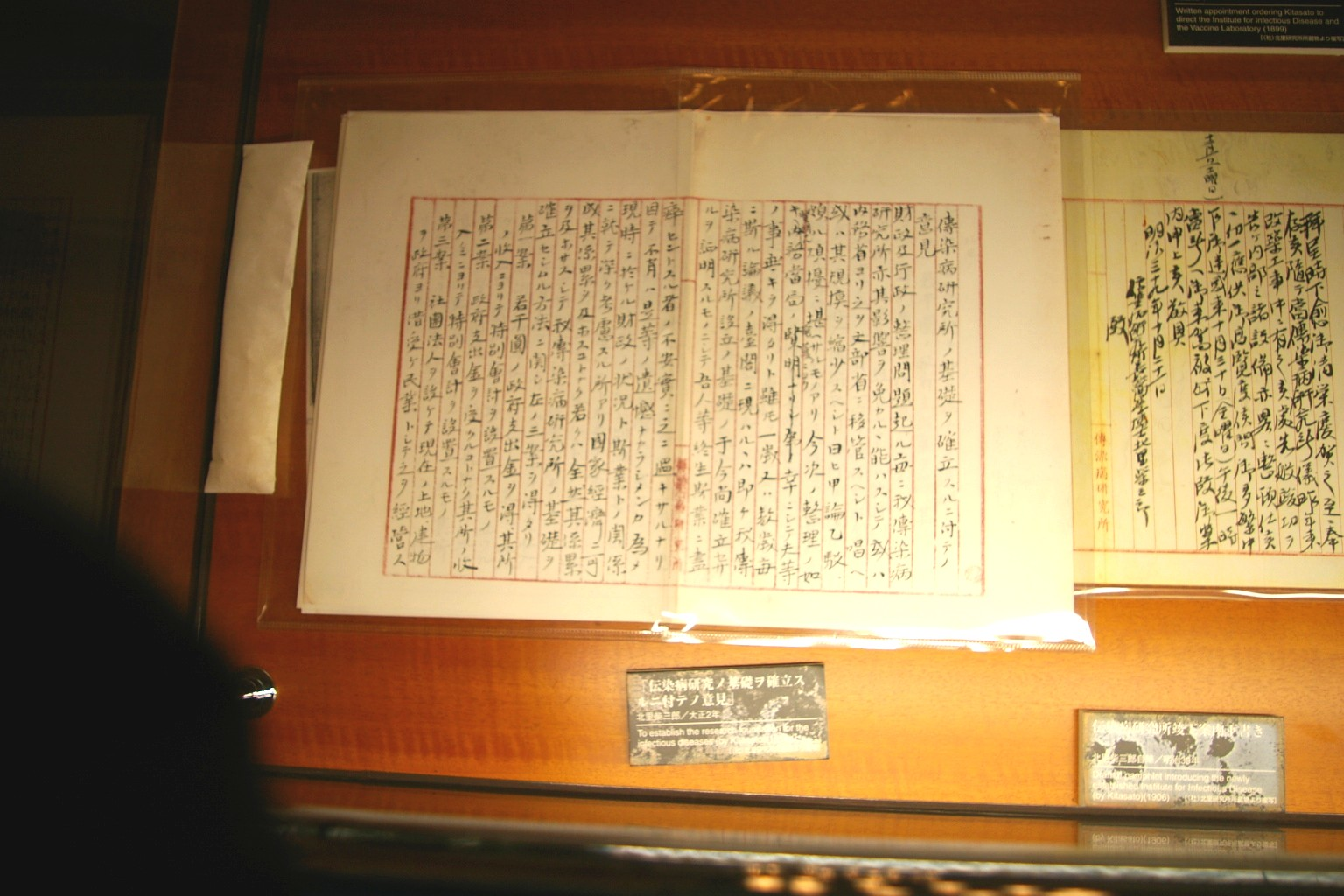
Exhibit in the Medical Science Museum

== See also ==
- Constructions of the University of Tokyo
- National Institute of Public Health of Japan
