= Noboru =

Noboru (written: 昇, 登, 謄, 盛, のぼる in hiragana or ノボル katakana) is a masculine Japanese given name. Notable people with the name include:

- Noboru Akiyama (秋山 登; 1934–2000), Japanese Nippon Professional Baseball pitcher
- Noboru Ando (安藤 昇; 1926–2015), Japanese film actor known for his yakuza roles
- Noboru Aomi (青海 上; born 1938), Japanese former wrestler
- Noboru Aota (青田 昇; 1924–1997), Japanese professional baseball player
- Noboru Asahi (朝日 昇; born 1968), Japanese retired mixed martial artist
- Noboru Daishin (大心 昇; 1937–2012), Japanese sumo wrestler
- Noboru Iguchi (井口 昇; born 1969), Japanese film director, screenwriter and actor
- Noboru Ishiguro (athlete) (石黒 昇; 1932–2021), Japanese racewalker
- Noboru Ishiguro (石黒 昇; 1938–2012), Japanese anime director, anime producer and animator
- Noboru Ishizaki (石崎 昇; 1893–1959), Japanese rear admiral
- Noboru Ito (伊藤 昇; 1903–1993), Japanese composer
- Noboru Iwamura (岩村 昇; 1927–2005), Japanese biologist, medical doctor and professor of medicine
- Noboru Jahana (謝花 昇; 1865–1908), official in the government of Japan's Okinawa Prefecture
- Noboru Kaneko (金子 昇; born 1974), Japanese actor
- Noboru Karashima (辛島 昇; 1933–2015), Japanese historian, writer and Professor Emeritus
- Noboru Kawasaki (川崎 のぼる; born 1941), Japanese manga artist
- Noboru Kikuta (菊田 昇; 1926–1991), Japanese gynecologist
- Noboru Kitanonada (北の洋 昇; 1923–2002), Japanese sumo wrestler
- Noboru Kitawaki (北脇 昇; 1901–1951), Japanese painter and writer
- Noboru Kousaka (上坂 昇; 1918–2013), Japanese former politician
- Noboru Kotonishiki (琴錦 登; 1922–1974), Japanese sumo wrestler
- Noboru Kousaka (上坂 昇; 1918–2013), Japanese former politician
- Noboru Kurakawa (倉川 昇; born 1968), Japanese bodybuilder and professional wrestler
- Noboru Kyokushūzan (旭鷲山 昇; born 1973), former professional sumo wrestler and current politician from Ulaanbaatar, Mongolia
- Noboru Minowa (箕輪 登; 1924–2006), Japanese member of the House of Representatives of Japan
- Noboru Miyake (三宅 昇; 1896–1988), Japanese American politician
- Noboru Miyata (宮田 登; 1936–2000), Japanese folklorist
- Noboru Nakamura (中村 登; 1913–1981), Japanese film director and screenwriter
- Noboru Nakaya (仲谷 昇; 1929–2006), Japanese actor
- Noboru Niida (仁井田 陞; 1904–1966), Japanese academic and historian
- Noboru Ogasawara (小笠原 登; 1888–1970), Japanese physician
- Noboru Okamoto (岡本 登; born 1937), Japanese hammer thrower
- Noboru Rokuda (六田 登; born 1952), Japanese manga artist
- Noboru Ryūō (龍皇 昇; born 1983), professional sumo wrestler from Ulan-Bator, Mongolia
- Noboru Ryugaki (柳ヶ木 昇; born 1987), Japanese singer, actor, and voice actor
- Noboru Shimizu (清水 昇; born 1996), Japanese professional baseball player
- Noboru Shimura (志村 謄; born 1993), Japanese footballer
- Noboru Sugai (須貝 昇; born 1949), Japanese professional golfer
- Noboru Sugimoto (杉本 盛; born 1914), Japanese freestyle swimmer who competed in the 1932 Summer Olympics
- Noboru Sugimura (杉村 升; 1948–2005), Japanese television and video game writer
- Noboru Tahara (田原 伸平; born 1983), Japanese retired mixed martial artist
- Noboru Takeshita (竹下 登; 1924–2000), Japanese politician and the 74th Prime Minister of Japan (1987 to 1989)
- Noboru Tanaka (田中 登; 1937–2006), Japanese film director
- Noboru Tanaka (field hockey) (田中 昇; born 1912), Japanese field hockey player
- Noboru Terada (寺田 登; 1917–1986), Japanese freestyle swimmer
- Noboru Tokita (1923–2014), Japanese scientist
- Noboru Tsuburaya (円谷 皐; 1935–1995), Japanese film producer
- Noboru Tsujihara (辻原 登; born 1945), prize-winning Japanese author of fiction
- Noboru Uchiyama (内山 昇; born 1954), Japanese boxer
- Noboru Ueda (上田 昇; born 1967), former Grand Prix motorcycle road racer
- Noboru Ueki (植木 昇; 1905–1992), Japanese photographer
- Noboru Waseda (早稲田 昇; born 1951), Japanese swimmer
- Noboru Yamada (山田 昇; 1950–1989), Japanese alpinist
- Noboru Yamaguchi (山口 登; 1902–1942), the second kumicho, or Godfather, of the Yamaguchi-gumi yakuza gang in Japan
- Noboru Yamaguchi (author) (ヤマグチ ノボル; 1972–2013), male Japanese light novel and game scenario author

== Fictional characters ==
- Noboru Shima (嶋 昇), a character in the tokusatsu series Kamen Rider Blade
- Noboru Yoshikawa (吉川 のぼる 昇), a character in the manga/anime series Great Teacher Onizuka

== See also ==
- 4807 Noboru, a main-belt asteroid
