= Citizens' Plaza =

Urban space in Shinjuku, Tokyo, Japan

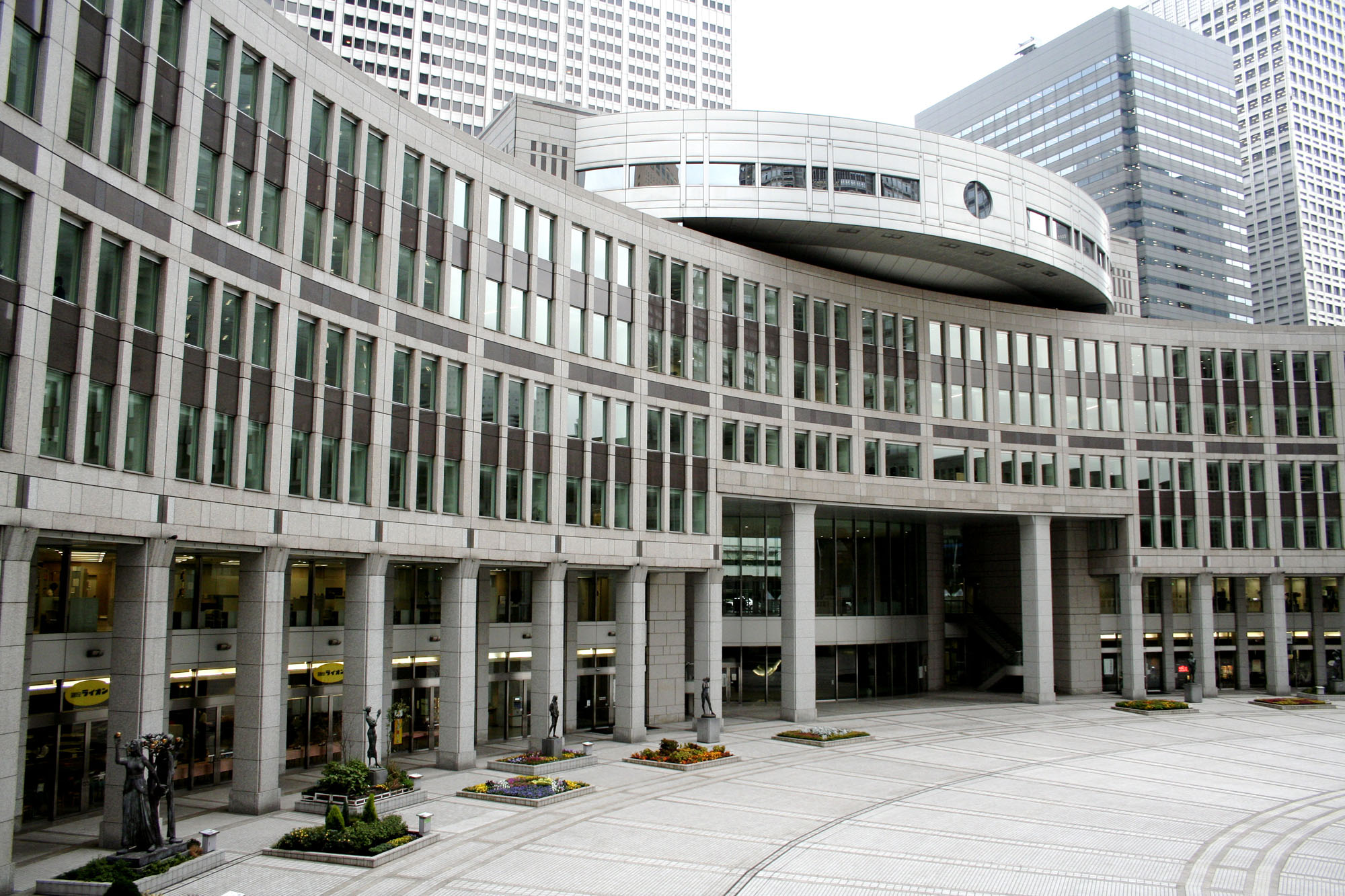
- Part of the plaza in 2006
- Type: Plaza
- Location: Shinjuku, Tokyo, Japan

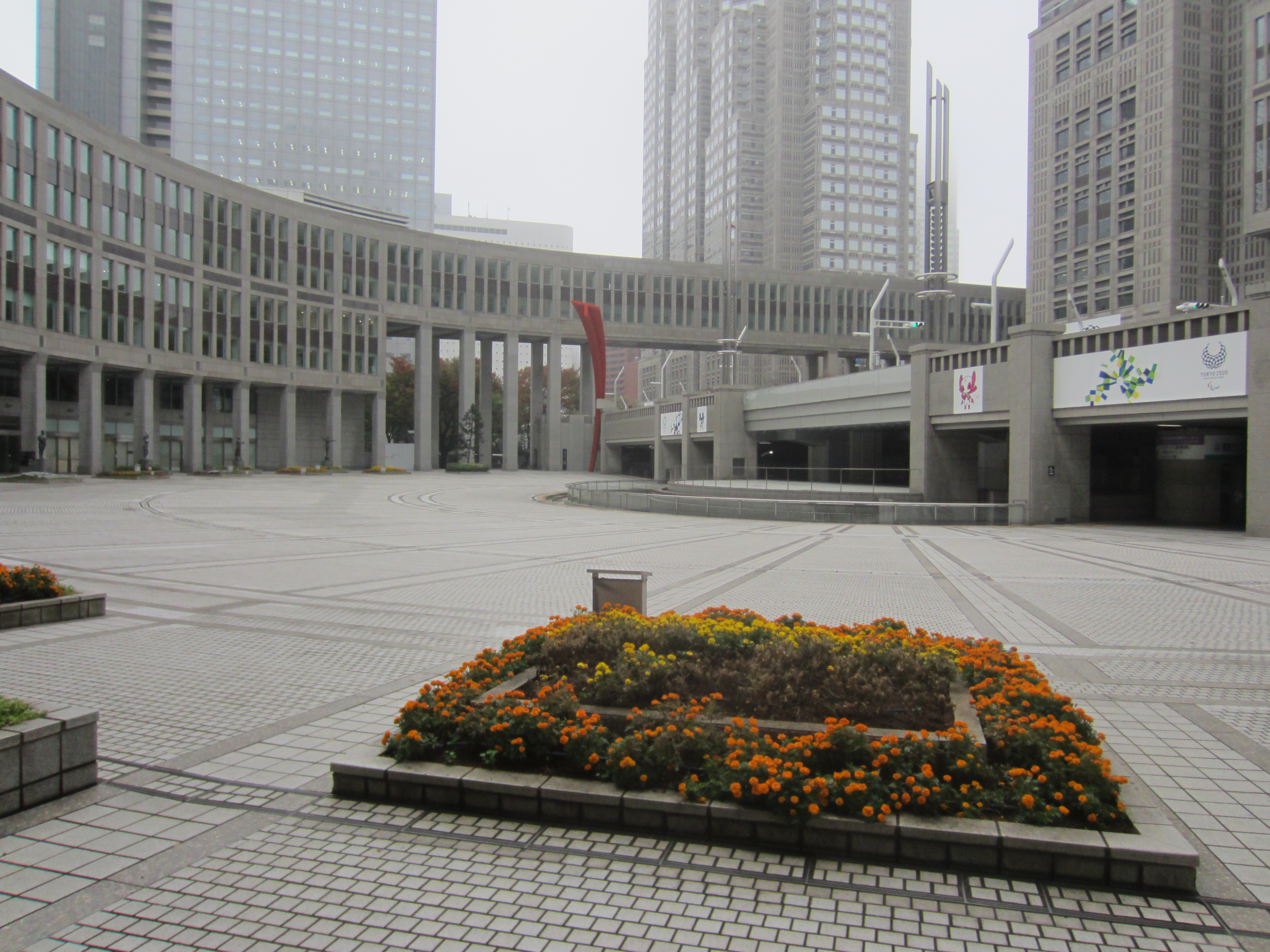
The plaza in 2019

Citizens' Plaza (or Citizen's Plaza) is an urban plaza in Shinjuku, Tokyo, Japan.

== Public art ==
Artworks installed in the plaza include:

- Adam Y Eva (Junkanmutan) (Munehiro Ikeda)
- Blacken Sproute (Churyo Sato)
- Column of Four Squares Eccentric (George Rickey)
- Epidauros・Reminiscence (Toshio Yodoi)
- Flutter (Yasutake Dvunakoshi)
- In the wind (Goro Kakei)
- Listening to the Heaven (Keiko Amemiya)
- Mari (Kyoko Asakura)
- my sky hole 91 Tokyo (Bukichi Inoue)
- Song of a dog (Yoshitatsu Yanaguihara)
- Three Rectangles Horizontal Jointed Gyratory (George Rickey)
