= Japan Academy Prize =

Japan Academy Prize may refer to:

- Japan Academy Prize (academics), an award of the Japan Academy in recognition of outstanding academic achievements
- Japan Academy Film Prize, an award of the Nippon Academy-Sho Association for achievements in film
- Imperial Prize of the Japan Academy, an award of the Japan Academy to non-members in recognition of outstanding academic achievements
