= Yanosuke =

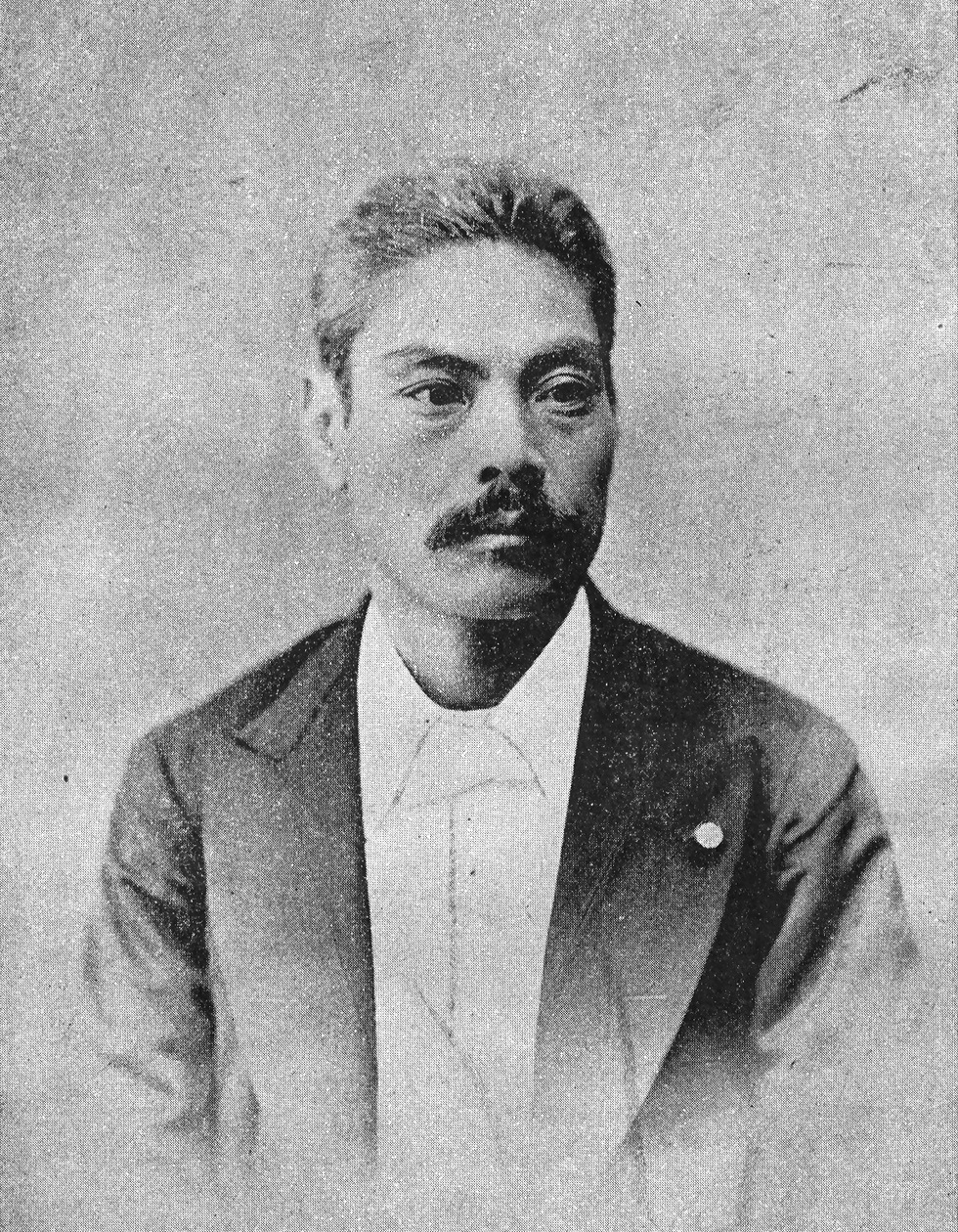
- Yanosuke Iwasaki (1851–1908), Japanese businessman
- Pronunciation: janosɯke (IPA)
- Gender: Male
- Language: Japanese

Origin
- Origin: Japanese
- Meaning: Different meanings depending on the kanji used

Yanosuke is a masculine Japanese given name.

== Written forms ==
Yanosuke can be written using different combinations of kanji characters. Here are some examples:

- 弥之助 or 彌之助, "more and more, of, help"
- 弥之介 or 彌之介, "more and more, of, mediate"
- 弥之輔 or 彌之輔, "more and more, of, help"
- 弥之丞 or 彌之丞, "more and more, of, help"
- 弥之甫 or 彌之甫, "more and more, of, begin"
- 野之助, "field, of, help"
- 野之介, "field, of, mediate"
- 野之輔, "field, of, help"
- 野之丞, "field, of, help"
- 野之甫, "field, of, begin"
- 矢之助, "arrow, of, help"
- 矢之介, "arrow, of, mediate"
- 矢之輔, "arrow, of, help"
- 矢之丞, "arrow, of, help"
- 矢之甫, "arrow, of, begin"
- 夜之助, "night, of, help"
- 夜之介, "night, of, mediate"

The name can also be written in hiragana やのすけ or katakana ヤノスケ.

== Notable people with the name ==
- Yanosuke Hirai (平井 弥之助; 1902–1986), Japanese civil engineer
- Yanosuke Iwasaki (岩崎 彌之助; 1851–1908), Japanese businessman
- Yanosuke Watanabe (渡邊 彌之助), Japanese footballer
- Yanosuke Otsuka (大塚 弥之助), Japanese geologist

== Fictional characters ==
Yanosuke Hiiragi (柊 夜ノ介), from Tokimeki Memorial game series.
