= Midnight Occult Civil Servants =

Japanese manga and anime series

- The cover of the first volume.

真夜中のオカルト公務員 (Mayonaka no Okaruto Kōmuin)
- Genre: Urban fantasy
- Manga
- Written by: Yōko Tamotsu
- Published by: Kadokawa Shoten
- Magazine: Monthly Asuka
- Original run: May 23, 2015 – February 22, 2022
- Volumes: 17
- Novel
- Written by: Masumi Suzuki
- Published by: Kadokawa Shoten
- Imprint: Kadokawa Horror Bunko
- Published: July 24, 2018
- Anime television series
- Directed by: Tetsuya Watanabe
- Written by: Tatsuto Higuchi
- Music by: Evan Call
- Studio: Liden Films
- Licensed by: Crunchyroll (Note: In North America through Crunchyroll, LLC (formerly known as Funimation).)
- Original network: Tokyo MX, SUN, BS11, KBS, TVA
- Original run: April 7, 2019 – June 23, 2019
- Episodes: 12 + 3 OVA

Midnight Occult Civil Servants (Japanese: 真夜中のオカルト公務員, Hepburn: Mayonaka no Okaruto Kōmuin) is a Japanese manga series written and illustrated by Yōko Tamotsu. The manga has inspired a novelization by Masumi Suzuki, and an anime television series adaptation by Liden Films aired from April 7 to June 23, 2019. The anime series has been streamed in North America by Crunchyroll and Funimation. The series follows Arata Miyako, a newly recruited staff member of the Shinjuku Ward Nocturnal Community Relations Division (NCRD) who possesses the "Ears of Sand", giving him the ability to understand the languages of supernatural creatures called the Anothers. His main role with the Shinjuku Ward NCRD is to maintain relations with the Anothers.

== Characters ==
Arata Miyako (宮古 新, Miyako Arata)
Voiced by: Jun Fukuyama (Japanese); Brandon McInnis (English)
Arata is the newly recruited staff member of the Shinjuku Ward Nocturnal Community Relations Division (NCRD). He is a descendant of and resembles his ancestor Abe no Seimei. He possesses the "Ears of Sand", giving him the ability to understand the languages of the Anothers.
Kyōichi Sakaki (榊 京一, Sakaki Kyōichi)
Voiced by: Tomoaki Maeno (Japanese); J. Michael Tatum (English)
Kyōichi is the shift leader of the Shinjuku Ward NCRD.
Theo Himezuka (姫塚セオ, Himetsuka Seo)
Voiced by: Miyu Irino (Japanese); Stephen Fu (English)
Theo is a longtime staff member of the Shinjuku Ward NCRD. He is half-British and half-Japanese. He designs and creates a lot of the materials and tools used by Shinjuku Ward NCRD and other prefecture divisions.
Reiji Senda (仙田礼二, Senda Reiji)
Voiced by: Kōji Yusa (Japanese); Aaron Roberts (English)
Senda is the head of the Shinjuku Ward NCRD.
Satoru Kanoichi (狩野 悟, Kanoichi Satoru)
Voiced by: Takahiro Sakurai
Satoru is a member of the Tokyo Metropolitan Nocturnal, Cultural and Environmental Department. He has a scar on his left eyebrow. He is a ruthless realist who despises Anothers and chooses to eliminate or neutralize them.
Huehuecóyotl (ウェウェコヨトル, Wewekoyotoru) / Kohaku (琥珀)
Voiced by: Shun'ichi Toki (Japanese); Christopher Wehkamp (English)
Huehuecóyotl (The Old Coyote) is an Aztec god of music and dance, but they are also a trickster god who created chaos. Their gender is unknown. They were renamed Kohaku (Amber) after a black fox by Abe no Seimei.
Yuki (ユキ)
Voiced by: Kazutomi Yamamoto (Japanese); Wendy Powell (English)
Yuki is an Another in the form of a nekomata, a feline creature with two tails. He takes the form of a white cat with blue eyes. He was tasked with guarding the storehouse at Miyako's family home by one of Arata's ancestors. He was a playmate of Arata when he was a child.

== Media ==
=== Manga ===
Yōko Tamotsu launched the manga in Kadokawa Shoten's shōjo manga magazine Monthly Asuka on May 23, 2015, and ended it on February 22, 2022. The manga is also serialized online on Kadokawa's Comic Newtype magazine.

No.	Japanese release date	Japanese ISBN
1	December 26, 2015	978-4-04-103660-0
2	January 26, 2016	978-4-04-103661-7
3	June 25, 2016	978-4-04-104543-5
4	November 26, 2016	978-4-04-105104-7
5	April 24, 2017	978-4-04-105557-1
6	September 23, 2017	978-4-04-106078-0
7	February 24, 2018	978-4-04-106080-3
8	June 23, 2018	978-4-04-107044-4
9	December 22, 2018	978-4-04-107597-5
10	March 22, 2019	978-4-04-108000-9
11	July 24, 2019	978-4-04-108220-1
12	November 22, 2019	978-4-04-108221-8; 978-4-04-108223-2 (SP)
13	May 23, 2020	978-4-04-109437-2
14	October 24, 2020	978-4-04-110811-6
15	March 24, 2021	978-4-04-111271-7
16	August 24, 2021	978-4-04-111909-9
17	March 23, 2022	978-4-04-112468-0; 978-4-04-112469-7 (SP)

=== Novel ===
A novelization by Masumi Suzuki was published by Kadokawa under their Kadokawa Horror Bunko label on July 24, 2018 (ISBN 9784041065990).

=== Anime ===
An anime television series adaptation was announced on June 21, 2018. The series is directed by Tetsuya Watanabe and written by Tatsuto Higuchi, with animation by studio Liden Films. Eriko Itō is designing the characters. The series aired from April 7 to June 23, 2019, on Tokyo MX, SUN, BS11, KBS, and TVA. Jun Fukuyama performed the series' opening theme song "dis-communicate", while Shunichi Toki performed the series' ending theme song "Yakusoku no Overture". A two-episode OVA titled "Hitori Bocchi no Kyūketsuki" was bundled with the series' Blu-ray release on September 25, 2019. An original animation DVD was released on November 22, 2019, bundled with the 12th manga volume.

No.	Title (Note: All English episode titles taken from Crunchyroll.)	Original air date
1	"Angels and Tengu Above the Shinjuku Skyline"; Transliteration: "Shinjuku Jōkū no Tengu to Tenshi" (Japanese: 新宿上空の天狗と天使)	April 7, 2019
Arata Miyako is recruited into the Shinjuku Ward Nocturnal Community Relations Division (NCRD), where he meets staff member Theo Himezuka and shift leader Kyōichi Sakaki in an office disguised as a storage room. As a rite of passage, Kyōichi and Theo take Arata to the imperial gardens, the home to the Anothers, which are any angel, devil, yōkai or fairy, including the friendly beast known as a cù-sìth. Arata, Kyōichi and Theo use special barrier tape to form a noise-cancelling barrier due to reports of loud noises in the area, particularly from territorial struggles between angels and tengu. Arata witnesses a romantic exchange between tengu Tarobo Yotsuya and angel Adiel. However, Tarobo's father Fudobo Yotsuya defends Tarobo from Adiel's sister Folciel, who claims that Tarobo is deceiving Adiel. Fudobo and Folciel soon chase Tarobo and Adiel from the imperial gardens to the city hall in Citizens' Plaza. When Kyōichi and Theo attack Fudobo and Folciel without hearing their voices, Arata explains that he can hear the voices of the Anothers. Tarobo and Adiel break news of their elopement to Fudobo and Folciel, thus restoring peace between angels and tengu. Arata is approached by elderly tengu Senjinbo Myohosan, who refers to Arata as "Abe no Seimei".
2	"The White Nekomata of Kagurazaka"; Transliteration: "Kagurazaka no Shiroi Nekomata" (Japanese: 神楽坂の白い猫又)	April 14, 2019
At the office, Arata wakes up from his collapse and is introduced to Reiji Senda, head of the Shinjuku Ward NCRD. Arata has the "Ears of Sand", giving him the ability to understand the language of the Anothers. Izumi Matsuno, a friend of Arata, briefly visits his home in Kagurazaka just as Kyōichi and Theo arrive to investigate Arata's connection to his ancestor Abe no Seimei. Inside a storehouse containing old books from Arata's late grandfather, Arata is welcomed by nekomata Yuki, who has guarded the storehouse for generations. Arata convinces Yuki to guard the old books at the office. At the imperial gardens, Arata, Kyōichi and Theo look for traces of a kisha, a nine-headed bird with ten necks, but they find three flightless fairies, who explain that their fairy wing powder was stolen by an Another riding on the kisha. At Kanoichi Bunko Publishing, part of the Chiyoda Ward NCRD, staff member Akane Kanoichi takes Arata, Kyōichi and Theo to meet zashiki-warashi Suzuka, whose lock of hair used for sealing a barrier was stolen by a beast in human form. The news reports that a robbery occurred at an imported goods store called Koseido, which secretly contains magical items. With reports of mysterious fires, Arata, Kyōichi and Theo chance upon a seal at Hakoneyama. Arata and Kyōichi are accidentally transported to an underground lair inside Hakoneyama, while Theo learns from Senda that mermaid scales were stolen from Koseido. Arata and Kyōichi are approached by Aztec god of music and dance Huehuecóyotl, who summons a horde of walking corpses called kyoushi.
3	"Trickster with Amber Eyes"; Transliteration: "Kohaku no Hitomi no Torikkusutā" (Japanese: 琥珀の瞳のトリックスター)	April 21, 2019
Akane arrives with fellow staff member Shota Shimizu and shift leader Yamashiro at Hakoneyama. Before telling them that all of the stolen items were used to create the kyoushi, Theo is also accidentally transported to the underground lair, realizing that Huehuecóyotl, known for his amber eyes, was behind this. Arata, Kyōichi and Theo manage to evade the kyoushi, which are actually the Anothers artificially made from corpses dated back to World War II. Huehuecóyotl believes that Arata is Abe to Seimei. Arata, Kyōichi and Theo follow a bundle of long threads, which give the kyoushi the ability to move, finding Suzuka's lock of hair near the altar. Surprisingly, the altar contains four mind-controlled schoolgirls, who were previously reported missing. Meanwhile, Akane, Shota and Yamashiro try to seal the perimeter with the barrier tape and fight off a second horde of kyoushi. Senda arrives in time to capture the horde of kyoushi using a net. Arata does not accept Huehuecóyotl's ultimatum to either kill or save the schoolgirls, leading Huehuecóyotl to make the schoolgirls strangle Kyōichi and Theo. When Arata remembers Huehuecóyotl's nickname as "Kohaku", Huehuecóyotl destroys all of the kyoushi. In the aftermath, the Chiyoda Ward NCRD have Suzuka's lock of hair back in their possession. Eitaro Yokoyama, a detective specializing in the Anothers, handles the report of the missing schoolgirls on his own. As Huehuecóyotl formerly introduces himself to the Shinjuku Ward NCRD, it is revealed that Huehuecóyotl is a trickster god who creates chaos. Arata orders Huehuecóyotl to call him by his real name, and Huehuecóyotl happily obliges with nostalgia.
4	"Fixed-Point Observation in Kabukicho"; Transliteration: "Kabuki'chō no Teiten Kansoku" (Japanese: 歌舞伎町の定点観測)	April 28, 2019
In his bedroom, Arata is woken up by Yuki, but Huehuecóyotl suddenly appears and explains that Abe no Seimei, who lived during the Heian period, had a thirst for knowledge about the world. Arata rushes to work, telling Kyōichi and Theo that Huehuecóyotl is not a major threat. Senda reminds Arata, Kyōichi and Theo to turn in their fixed-point observation reports. Arata, Kyōichi and Theo head to Kabukichō, where six of the Anothers are permanently settling. At the park, they stumble upon two Shōjō drunk off sake. After receiving information from police officer Haguro at a police box, Arata, Kyōichi and Theo enter an abandoned building, where Arata is spooked by a naked Azukiarai grinding beans. Meanwhile, Haguro and fellow police officer Nakamura pass by the Kio Shrine on their bikes, but Haguro is captured by an unknown Another. Arata, Kyōichi and Theo find Minerva's Owl at a discount outlet, a Dryad at the street Kuyaku-Dori, a Mezu at a movie theater plaza and a Bultungin at a batting center. Arata, Kyōichi and Theo spot an unconscious Haguro being dragged back to the shrine by the unknown Another, revealed as Kio Gongen, the deity of the shrine. When Arata requests Kio Gongen to release Haguro, Kio Gongen demands to have Haguro as his drinking buddy for 100 years. Huehuecóyotl suddenly appears and convinces Kio Gongen to have a drinking contest against Arata, Kyōichi and Theo in order to decide the fate of Haguro. When Theo passes out, Kyōichi presses on while ordering Arata to call for backup. Just when Kyōichi is about to give up, Arata arrives with several Shōjō, who manage to crash the drinking contest. Arata and Kyōichi then carry Haguro and Theo in the streets.
5	"The Parallel World Elevator of the City Hall Observation Deck"; Transliteration: "Tochō Tenbō-Shitsu no Isekai Erebētā" (Japanese: 都庁展望室の異世界エレベーター)	May 5, 2019
Senda and Yokoyama watch footage of the north elevator at the observation deck in the city hall, spotting a girl appearing out of thin air. Visitors taking the north or south elevators have reportedly disappeared to a parallel world or reappeared with amnesia. Kyōichi then informs Arata and Theo that Aoi, the girl from the footage, confirmed having amnesia, but she is not aware that she was heartbroken after breaking up with her boyfriend. At the observation deck, Theo takes the south elevator while Arata and Kyōichi take the north elevator. On the 45th floor, Arata and Kyōichi find the parallel world, the home of an Another in the form of a cloaked woman named Pandora, who holds an engraved box. She ends up taking Arata with her while sending Kyōichi back to the real world. Kyōichi tells Theo about the current situation, while Pandora tells Arata that she is looking for a sense of loss, one of the many tragic items previously contained in her box. It was actually Kyōichi's sense of loss that triggered the entrance into the parallel world. After capturing the sense of loss from a woman, Pandora sends the woman back to the real world. Realizing that he can still send text messages in the parallel world, Arata notifies Kyōichi and Theo that Pandora is unaware of the missing people and missing memories. Kyōichi and Theo figure out that there are no missing people but still missing memories, while Arata leaves the parallel world after he is unable to convince Pandora to stop using the elevators. As Senda closes the case, Arata still wonders about Kyōichi's sense of loss.
6	"Devil and Sense of Loss"; Transliteration: "Akuma to Sōshitsukan" (Japanese: 悪魔と喪失感)	May 12, 2019
Izumi invites Arata to the upcoming annual Kagurazaka Festival. Meanwhile, Huehuecóyotl meets with a devilish Another, a demon named Azazel, who struggles to revive a dead woman by stealing the souls of different schoolgirls. At the office, Senda prepares to go to Romania for a couple weeks while leaving Theo in charge. Theo sends Arata to meet with Kyōichi at a hospital in order to interview Yuko Shiba, one of the previously captured schoolgirls who finally regained consciousness. Yuko remembers seeing black sand before being captured and that she felt pressure on her throat. Kyōichi deduces that Yuko's singing voice was somehow stolen after Yuko is unable to sing a high note. At a coffeehouse, Kyōichi shows Arata that both Yuko and Kyōichi's older sister Shiori Sakaki were among the list of missing schoolgirls. Seventeen years ago, Kyōichi and Shiori were orphaned children, but Shiori was suddenly kidnapped by Azazel. In the present, Kyōichi begs Arata to interrogate Huehuecóyotl, and Arata realizes that Pandora referred to Shiori as Kyōichi's sense of loss. Back at the office, Theo eventually suspects that Arata and Kyōichi are hiding something. At a restaurant, despite Arata unable to find Huehuecóyotl, Kyōichi tells Arata that they should not drag Theo into their private investigation. Arata hangs out with Izumi during the Kagurazaka Festival. However, Izumi is suddenly kidnapped by Azazel right in front of Arata, who then contacts Kyōichi about the situation while a disappointed Theo lashes out on Kyōichi for keeping a secret. Arata calls on Huehuecóyotl, who eventually says that Azazel is responsible for the kyoushi ritual as well as taking Izumi to hell.
7	"Sense of Loss and Proof of Despair"; Transliteration: "Sōshitsukan to Zetsubō no Shōmei" (Japanese: 喪失感と絶望の証明)	May 19, 2019
Azazel furthers his plan to revive the woman, reminiscing about the time that he first fell in love with her when she was alive. While driving around, Theo confronts Kyōichi for using Arata to interrogate Huehuecóyotl about Azazel. Arriving at the office, Theo tracks down the entrance to hell for Arata and Kyōichi, narrowing down the search to four nearby all-girls high schools where Azazel's hideout might be located. After Arata, Kyōichi and Theo visits Higashi Inada Girls High, Shinjuku Acet Girls Academy and Shinjuku Aizenin Girls High, they arrive at Shinjuku Shurin Girls High and find Huehuecóyotl, who grants them access to the entrance to hell. As Huehuecóyotl leads them down a dark hallway, it is revealed that Azazel has been a fallen angel ever since falling in love with the woman. As a garden of wolf's bane is spotted deeper inside the hallway, an Another in the form of a three-headed dog named Cerberus emerges and chases Arata, Kyōichi and Theo. Meanwhile, Izumi and Shiori wake up in an underground chamber, where Azazel steals the souls of Izumi's left arm and Shiori's eyes. Huehuecóyotl stops Cerberus from devouring Arata, Kyōichi and Theo before they eventually find Izumi and Shiori in the underground chamber. Azazel's demon friend Belphegor subdues Arata, Kyōichi and Theo from interfering with Azazel's plan to revive the woman. However, the woman awakens in horror and begs Azazel to kill her, giving Azazel a sense of loss. Belphegor releases Arata, Kyōichi and Theo in the imperial gardens. Theo revives a blind Shiori, who recognizes Kyōichi's voice. As all the captured souls return to their rightful owners, Shiori's eyesight and Izumi's left arm movement are restored. Huehuecóyotl and Belphegor witness Azazel's proof of despair as he finds a schoolgirl in the streets who looks like the woman.
8	"Old Coyote and the Garden of Falling Stars"; Transliteration: "Oita Koyōte to Hoshi Furu Niwa" (Japanese: 老いたコヨーテと星降る庭)	May 26, 2019
Arata learns from Sachiko Kamata, an administrative scrivener of the NCRD, that his ancestor according to the genealogy chart is in fact Abe no Seimei, who was an onmyōji from the Heian period known for his skills in astronomy and astrology. After Kyōichi gives paperwork regarding Shiori to Kamata, Theo wonders whether or not to dismiss the missing schoolgirls case, seeing as Shiori has not aged since she was seventeen years old. At the mall, Izumi and Shiori shop for clothes while Kyōichi thanks Arata for bringing back his sister. Outside his home, Arata reassures Izumi not to worry about the type of cases that he investigates. Soon after, Arata and Yuki travel with Huehuecóyotl through Bunkyō Ward, Taitō Ward and Sumida Ward, passing by many of the Anothers secretly residing in each area. At Tokyo Skytree, Yuki is triggered when being insulted by an Another in the form of a crow named Kuro, who guided Abe no Seimei through Musashino. Meanwhile, Theo and Senda recall that the Ears of Sand caused Arata to sympathize with Azazel due to the sounds of hysteria and despair. Kuro takes Arata, Huehuecóyotl and Yuki to Abe no Seimei's beautiful home, the Garden of Falling Stars. Arata learns that Huehuecóyotl ceased to exist after Abe no Seimei went away. Huehuecóyotl leaves with content after Arata continues to call him by the nickname "Kohaku". As Kuro tells Arata and Yuki that the last train at the nearby Aoto Station already left for the night, Arata spends 6,000 yen in order to travel back to Kagurazaka via taxi. When Arata returns to the office, Theo and Senda inform Arata that his stroll with the "Old Coyote" caused the Anothers, including rokurokubi, kappa, tanuki and okurijochin, to panic and hide.
9	"The Dream Demon of the Haunted Apartment Block"; Transliteration: "Yūrei Danchi no Naitomea" (Japanese: 幽霊団地の夢魔(ナイトメア))	June 2, 2019
A boy named Ryo Aida has a nightmare about being caught for the second time in a game of tag by an Another called the Dream Demon in a haunted apartment block, and his older brother Kakeru Aida shows concern. After receiving an urgent message from Senda at the office, Kyōichi sends Arata to talk to Koharu Aida, Ryo's mother who works in general affairs. At a restaurant, Koharu tells Arata that Ryo recently fell into a coma after having nightmares about the Dream Demon, rumored to eat its victims after catching them three times. Back at the office, Arata is surprised when Senda temporarily transfers him to the Chiyoda Ward NCRD in the middle of his case. At the restaurant, Arata meets with Shota as well as Akane's cousin Satoru Kanoichi, a member of the Tokyo Metropolitan Nocturnal, Cultural and Environmental Department. Shota and Satoru confirm that the Dream Demon is a recurring incident, but they are against Arata's idea on trying to communicate with the Dream Demon. At Shinjuku Station, Kakeru tells Arata, Shota and Satoru that Ryo's friends Acchan and Yo had the same nightmares before their absence from school. After finding the abandoned apartment building where Ryo, Acchan and Yo used to play, Shota and Satoru leave Arata to investigate on his own. Arata soon learns that the Dream Demon plays tag with children because it is lonely. Empathizing with the Dream Demon, Arata convinces it to make new friends. When Arata introduces the Dream Demon to Shota and Satoru outside the apartment building, Satoru annihilates the Dream Demon in front of a devastated Arata. Meanwhile, Ryo wakes up from his coma. Satoru berates Arata for defending the integrity of the Anothers yet being surrounded by people who are not honest with him.
10	"White Cocoons and Blue Flames"; Transliteration: "Shiroi Mayu to Aoi Honō" (Japanese: 白い繭と青い炎)	June 9, 2019
Arata is offered to crack a case at an Olympic stadium in order to prove Satoru wrong about the Ears of Sand. Koharu, Kakeru and Ryo all thank Arata for his help. At the office, Kyōichi, Theo and Senda tell Arata that the Anothers are just as manipulative as humans even though Satoru harshly handled the Dream Demon. Since there are reports of an Another stalling construction at the stadium, Arata, Satoru and Shota find a large nest of eggs inside. When Arata realizes that the eggs are white cocoons laid by an insect-type Another, he opens one of them and surprisingly finds a baby spinning threaded fibers from its mouth. Satoru, bent on getting rid of the cocoons as soon as possible, relieves Arata from the case. Arata returns home while Huehuecóyotl leaves with plans to make special garments with the threaded fibers for an impending festival. At an elevator in the city hall, Satoru runs into Akane. She not only explains her connection with Suzuka ever since first meeting Arata, but she also reminds Satoru that her uncle gave him a scar on his left eyebrow due to his hatred towards the Anothers. Later at the imperial gardens, Arata, Kyōichi and Theo piece together that the festival being held in Izumo will celebrate the month of the gods. They conclude that Satoru plans to burn the cocoons even though the Anothers are using the cocoons as a silk farm. Back at the stadium, Satoru orders his crew to burn the cocoons by the use of talismans emitting blue flames. Huehuecóyotl brings the mother of the cocoons named Manari to the stadium, where she wraps the crew in cocoons. Shota, the only one left standing, contacts Arata and requests immediate help.
11	"The Ears of Sand and the Guts of a New Employee"; Transliteration: "Suna no Mimi to Shinjin no Konjō" (Japanese: 砂の耳と新人の根性)	June 16, 2019
After the three fairies angrily explain to Arata that the cocoons were offerings to a silkworm god, Senda drives Arata, Kyōichi and Theo to the stadium. On the way, they discuss about the use of rituals to avoid a curse and appease a silkworm god. Arata agrees to use the Ears of Sand in order to resolve the matter. At the stadium, Satoru frees himself and traps Manari, but Arata, Kyōichi and Theo arrive to interfere. Satoru is contacted by Senda, who informs him that the jurisdiction over dealing with Manari has been handed over to the Shinjuku Ward NCRD. Arata formally apologizes to Manari after she is released by Satoru. However, as Manari expresses anger over what the humans did to the cocoons, Arata shows guts of a new employee by promising to spin the silk for her before dawn. While Arata rushes off before telling Kyōichi and Theo to spin the silk, Senda has Akane, Shota and Yamashiro use talismans to put out the blue flames. Returning soon after, Arata enlists the much needed help of angels and tengu, including Adiel and Tarobo, in order to finish the job. Arata contemplates how the Ears of Sand helped him realize that the humans and the Anothers are alike in some ways. Thanks to the humans and the Anothers who helped, they manage to spin all the silk before dawn. Manari leaves with her silk and babies in tow after forgiving Arata for the folly of the humans. Huehuecóyotl and Yuki head to Izumo, while Satoru leaves with Akane after warning Arata that he was lucky this time. Arata, Kyōichi, Theo and Senda plan to go celebrate afterwards.
12	"Shinjuku Ward Nocturnal Community Relations Division"; Transliteration: "Shinjuku-ku Yakan Chi'iki Kōryūka" (Japanese: 新宿区夜間地域交流課)	June 23, 2019
In the imperial gardens, Arata encounters Volos, an Another with amnesia and an elderly appearance. Bringing Volos to the office, Arata learns that Volos lost his statue as a vessel to host his spirit. Since Kyōichi is busy helping Shiori finalize her post-graduation plans and Theo is busy updating the database, Senda leaves Arata to spend time with Volos. After a mishap with honey, Arata takes Volos back to his house, where Huehuecóyotl and Yuki leave in disapproval. Over the next few nights, Arata fails to find a new home for Volos, who gradually has a youthful appearance. At the Kio Shrine, Kio Gongen tells Volos to leave, while Arata passes out from extreme exhaustion and wakes up in the office. Although Kyōichi and Theo figure out that Volos is slowly draining Arata's life force, Arata disallows Volos from leaving his side. Despite the dangers, Kyōichi and Theo support Arata in spending more time with Volos and gathering more information. At his house, Arata shares honey imported from Ukraine with Volos, and the latter has nostalgia over its taste. Later, Theo finds out that Volos is the god of forests and hunting. Senda sends Arata and Volos to a traveling exhibit on ancient Ukraine, where Volos finds a new statue as his vessel. Before Volos leaves with the traveling exhibit, he thanks Arata for showing him human emotions. Huehuecóyotl and Yuki return, as Arata makes his way back to the office. Arata reflects his role in the Shinjuku Ward NCRD, which is to maintain relations with the Anothers.
13 (OVA 3)	"The Blind Alley, The Boy, and I"; Transliteration: "Fukurokouji to Ano Ko to Ore to" (Japanese: 袋小路とあの子と俺と)	November 22, 2019
Arata, Kyōichi, Theo and Senda share a drink together, but Arata feels a little down because he got lost in his neighborhood for an hour. Earlier on, Arata ended up visiting a restaurant at a blind alley, where three kitsune who owned the restaurant knew him as the descendant of Abe no Seimei. He gave the three kisune some cold shiruko, which was originally meant for Theo, in order to repay the debt of their service. Fifteen years ago, Senda attended the Bon Festival during summer vacation at a local shrine as a junior in college. He found himself in an empty shrine but unable to leave the shrine steps. Senda spotted a blond boy, revealed to be a young Theo, also unable to leave. Theo, who explained that he was half-British and half-Japanese, was invited to the shrine by a temple priest named Akira. It turned out that a giant kisune was standing behind Senda, though only visible to Theo. When Theo saw the kisune pointing to the forest beyond the altar, Senda invited Theo to accompany him there. Senda said that he is an amplifier for powers and Theo is a compatible person who could see them. After Theo saw something oozing deeper in the forest, Senda dug up the ground and found a kodoku pot, which was a ritual tool used to bring disaster. They figured out that they must purify the kodoku pot with holy water. After the kisune pointed again, Theo and Senda dumped the kodoku pot in a waterfall. Theo used his special hair tie in order to heal Senda, whose right leg was injured by the poison. As Theo and Senda returned to the Bon Festival, they stayed together for the rest of summer vacation, and they ended up working together in Tokyo.
14 (OVA 1)	"Lonely Vampire"; Transliteration: "Hitoribocchi no Vanpaia" (Japanese: ひとりぼっちの吸血鬼(ヴァンパイア))	September 25, 2019
Two detectives named Kenji Chigusa and Katsumi Tamao from Section Zero, a department specializing in cases related to the Anothers, investigate the death of a hostess in the streets of Kabukichō, discovering bite marks on the hostess's common carotid artery. Yokoyama and Urara Ikujima then deduce that an Another caused the bite marks. Meanwhile, Theo invites Arata to visit Senda's luxurious home in the mountains, where an Another has lived there for fifteen years. Based on the autopsy report, the hostess named Shizuka Kanayama supposedly died by shock due to massive blood loss, leading Section Zero to speculate that the bite marks most likely came from a vampire. Yokoyama, Chigusa and Tamao pay a visit to Arata, Kyōichi, Theo and Senda at the office. Seeing as Japanese vampires have been extinct for a century, Theo believes that a vampire was possibly brought overseas to Japan by someone. After Yokoyama, Chigusa and Tamao leave, Theo tells Arata, Kyōichi and Senda that the Another living in the mountains is the last surviving Japanese vampire. Arata and Theo arrive at Aimoto Station, and Chigusa drives them to the mountains while explaining that Section Zero is doing an investigation regarding the vampire. Theo surprisingly informs that this vampire cannot be the culprit because the Japanese vampires, who only drink blood in order to transform sexes and breed with their kind, were massacred by humans long ago. Reaching a shed surrounded by cherry blossoms, Theo is distraught when reading a threatening message written in blood on the wall. After Chigusa reports that another female corpse was found holding Theo's lost blue earring, Theo realizes that the threatening message came from a man named Yosuke Saejima. Yokoyama and Tamao find Saejima's apartment, displaying a bulletin board full of crossed-out photos of Theo.
15 (OVA 2)	"Beneath the Cherry Tree Forest in Full Bloom"; Transliteration: "Sakura no Mori no Mankai no Shita" (Japanese: サクラの森の満開の下)	September 25, 2019
The lead suspect Saejima was a former researcher who captured and killed many Anothers, so Theo destroyed Saejima's reputation. At Senda's home, Senda tells Theo not to get involved with the investigation since a third female victim is now dead. In the streets, Arata and Kyōichi find one of the three fairies killed by an unknown assailant. When Arata and Kyōichi return to Senda's home, Theo informs that Saejima has a special tattoo on his face in order to conceal his appearance. In fact, Saejima put the victims to sleep by obtaining fairy dust, allowing the Japanese vampire, later recognized as Sakura, to claim the victims. After realizing that the three victims were all found on the west side of the Kanda River, Theo deduces that Sakura is hiding out at Shinjuku Central Park. Arata, Kyōichi and Theo head to the park, where Chigusa and Yokoyama are on standby. Theo finds Saejima at the park, where Sakura wakes up from a nap. With Arata acting as translator, Sakura thanks Theo for visiting all those years ago, but Sakura ultimately begs to be killed and end the bloodlust. Kyōichi intervenes after Sakura subdues Arata and Theo by secreting pheromones. Holding back bloodlust, Sakura requests Theo to bury the ashes under the cherry blossoms where the other Japanese vampires were killed. Though succumbing to bloodlust, Sakura is caught off guard by Theo's blue earrings, allowing Tamao to stab Sakura with a sword. As Chigusa and Yokoyama arrests Saejima, Sakura turns to ashes just as Theo tearfully calls Sakura by name. Later in prison, Saejima is dragged into hell by Belphegor. Theo buries Sakura's ashes under the cherry blossoms, leaving behind two blue earrings.
