= Takaoki Sasaki =

Japanese biochemist and oncologist

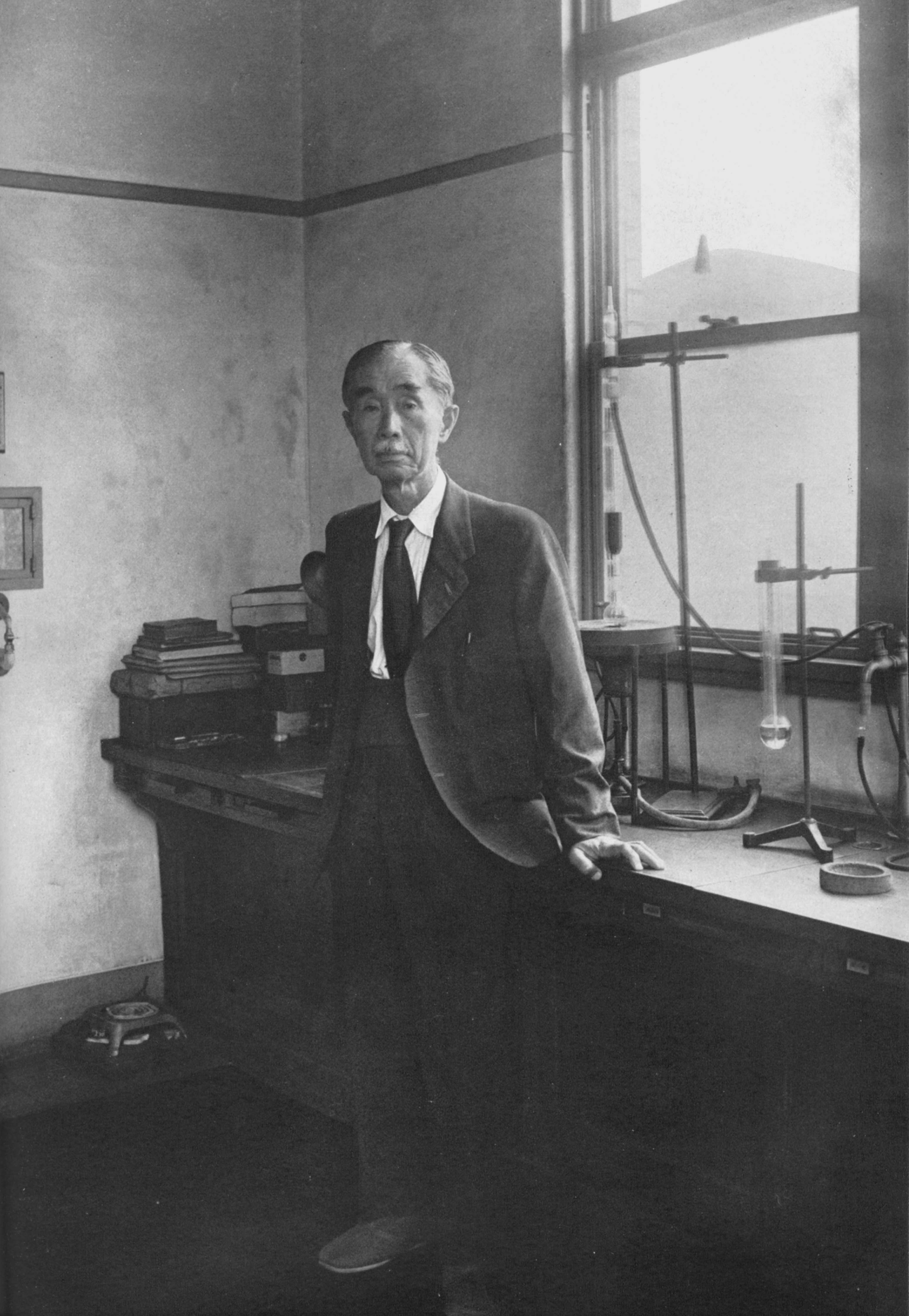
- portraits by Ken Domon 1953
- Born: May 5, 1878
- Died: October 31, 1966 (aged 88)
- Education: Tokyo Imperial University
- Known for: Carcinogenesis; Fencing
- Awards: Imperial Prize of the Japan Academy; Order of Culture
- Scientific career
- Fields: Biochemistry; Oncology
- Workplaces: Sasaki Institute; Japanese Foundation for Cancer Research; Kyoto Imperial University

Takaoki Sasaki (佐々木 隆興, Sasaki Takaoki; 1878–1966) was a Japanese biochemist and oncologist known for demonstrating the induction of liver cancer in rats by Ortho-Aminoazotoluene with his pupil Tomizo Yoshida. In addition, he was also known as a master of fencing in Japan. He received the Imperial Prize of the Japan Academy twice (1924 and 1936).

He was nominated for the Nobel Prize in Physiology or Medicine in 14 nominations.

== Life ==
Takaoki Sasaki who was Masakichi Sasaki's son-in-law graduated from the Medical College, Tokyo Imperial University and went to study Biochemistry, Bacteriology, and Serum therapy in Germany for five years. On returning to Japan, he was appointed as Professor of Internal Medicine, Kyoto Imperial University in 1913, before becoming Director of the Kyoundo Hospital in Tokyo in 1916. In addition, he became Director at the Cancer Institute, Japanese Foundation for Cancer Research in 1935.

In 1939 Sasaki donated his private research institute, together with some of his private property, and applied to the Japanese Government to establish a new medical foundation. This was approved by the Ministry of Education in January 1939 as a non profit research foundation, and then the Sasaki Foundation and its attached medical institute (the Sasaki Institute today) were established.

== Recognition ==
Sasaki received numerous honors and awards include the following:

- 1924 Imperial Prize of the Japan Academy
- 1936 Imperial Prize of the Japan Academy
- 1940 Order of Culture
- 1951 Person of Cultural Merit
