= Katsutada Sezawa =

Japanese seismologist

- 妹沢 克惟
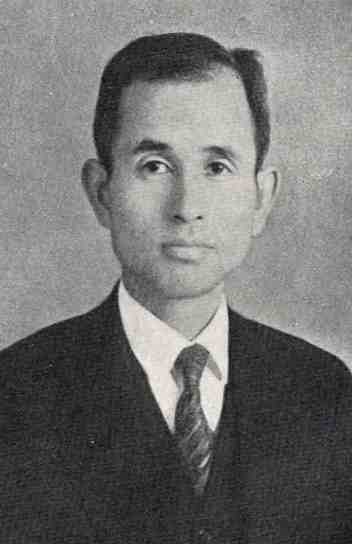
- Born: 21 August 1895; Ishikawa Prefecture, Japan
- Died: 23 April 1944 (aged 48)
- Education: Tokyo Imperial University
- Known for: Theoretical study of seismic wave generation and propagation and others
- Awards: Imperial Prize of the Japan Academy (1931)
- Scientific career
- Workplaces: Earthquake Research Institute

Katsutada Sezawa (Japanese: 妹沢 克惟, 21 August 1895 – 23 April 1944) was a Japanese geophysicist (Seismologist). Sezawa's key work was on the mathematical aspects of wave transmission in media of different viscosities and the Sezawa wave mode of surface waves is named after him.

Sezawa was born in Ishikawa Prefecture where his father was a judge. He graduated in 1921 from the Imperial University of Tokyo in shipbuilding and became a professor at the university in 1928. Sezawa became the director of the Earthquake Research Institute, University of Tokyo. His key work was on theoretical aspects of seismic wave transmission in different media. He was able to calculate differences in the structure of the earth based on seismic observations. He also predicted the existence of surface waves which are now termed as Sezawa waves. He was awarded the Imperial Prize of the Japan Academy (1931).
