= Hirase Sakugorō =

Japanese botanist and painter

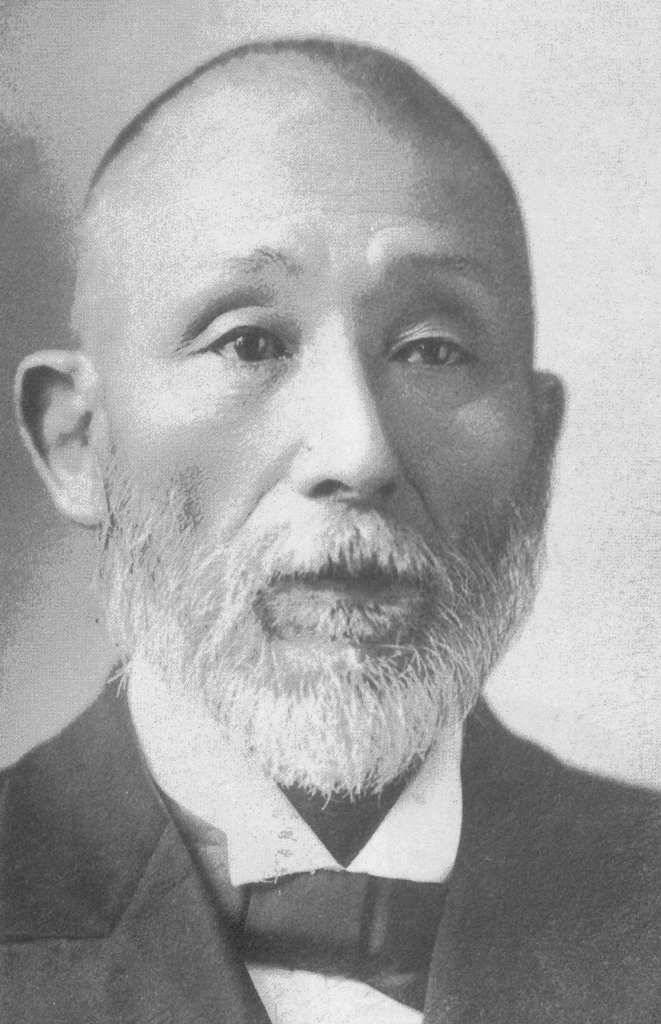
Hirase Sakugorō c. 1912

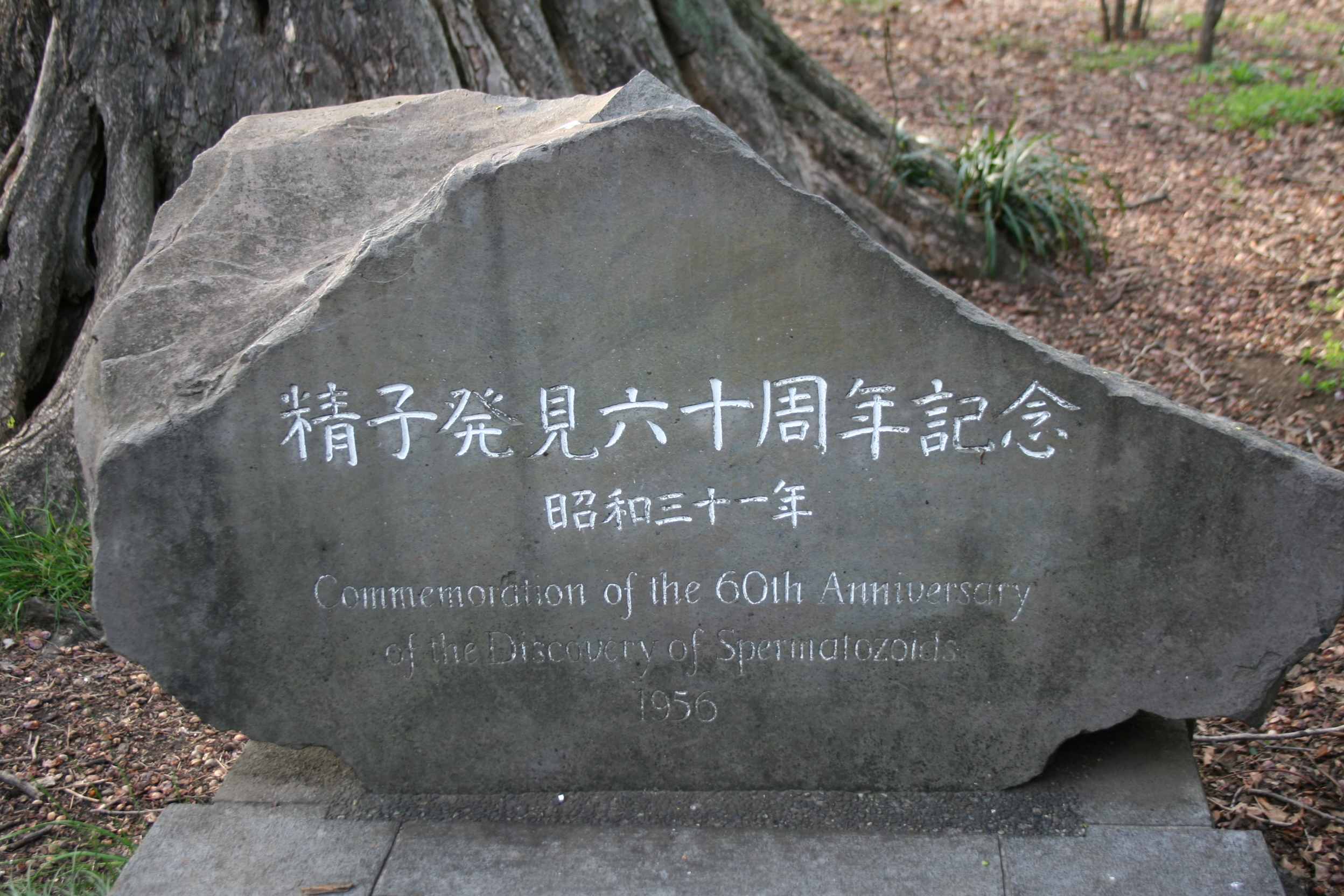
Monument for commemoration of 60th anniversary of the discovery of spermatozoon of Ginkgo biloba by Hirase Sakugorō, built in 1956 (Showa 31年)

Hirase Sakugorō (平瀬作五郎, February 12, 1856 – January 4, 1925) was a Japanese botanist and painter. Born into a samurai family in Fukui, Hirase discovered the spermatozoids of the ginkgo in January 1894, before Seiichiro Ikeno discovered the spermatozoids of the cycad. He is a laureate of the Imperial Prize of the Japan Academy (1912).

== Works ==
Selections regarding Ginkgo biloba:

- 1894a. Fecundation period of Ginkgo biloba. (In Japanese) Bot. Mag., Tokyo 8: 7-9.
- 1894b. Notes on the attraction-spheres in the pollen-cells of Ginkgo biloba. (In Japanese) Bot. Mag., Tokyo 8: 359-60; 361 -364.
- 1895a. Etudes sur le Ginkgo biloba (note pröliminaire). Bot. Mag., Tokyo 9: 239-240.
- 1895b. Etudes sur la föcondation et l´embryogönie du Ginkge biloba (1). J. Coll Sci. imp. Univ. Tokyo 8: 307-3 22.
- 1896a. Spermatozoid of Ginkgo biloba. (In Japanese) Bot. Mag., Tokyo 10:171.
- 1896b. On the spermatozoid of Ginkgo. (In Japanese) . Bot. Mag., Tokyo 10: 325-328.
- 1897. Untersuchungen über das Verhalten des Pollens von Ginkgo biloba. Bot. Zbl. 49: 33-35.
- 1898. Etudes sur la fécondation et l´embryogénie du Ginkgo biloba (second mémoire). J. Coll. Sei. imp. Univ. Tokyo 12: 103-149.
