= Seikaku Takagi =

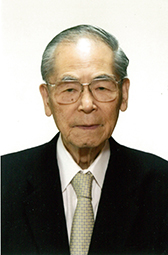
- Born: Ikuta Takagi (Japanese: 高木郁太); July 12, 1923; Japan; Sōja, Okayama Prefecture
- Died: February 24, 2017 (aged 93); Japan; Kurashiki, Okayama Prefecture
- Education: Okayama Prefectural Takahashi High School
- Alma mater: Okayama Prefectural Takahashi High School
- Known for: Japanese calligrapher
- Style: Chōyō Calligraphy Association
- Movement: 'Kana' Calligraphy
- Children: Seiu Takaki
- Awards: Japan Art Academy Prize; 4th Order of the Rising Sun; Dark Blue Ribbon Medal; Person of Cultural Merit; Order of Culture; Prime Minister's Award in JPN; Junior Third Rank

Seikaku Takagi (Japanese: 高木 聖鶴, Hepburn: Takagi Seikaku; July 12, 1923 (Taishō 12)– February 24, 2017 (Heisei 29)), was a Japanese calligrapher. He was male and held the rank of Junior Third Rank (Jūsanmi) and was awarded the Order of Culture. His real name was Ikuta Takagi (高木 郁太, Takagi Ikuta).

He served as the president of the Chōyō Calligraphy Association, advisor to the Japan Fine Arts Exhibition (a public-interest incorporated association), and senior advisor to the Japanese Calligraphy Institute. He was also the highest advisor to the Yomiuri Calligraphy Association and was recognized as a Person of Cultural Merit. Throughout his career, he held many important positions, including director of the Japan Calligraphy Institute, director and permanent general affairs officer of the Yomiuri Calligraphy Association, and executive director of the Japan Fine Arts Exhibition (a public-interest incorporated association). He also served as a councilor of the Japan Fine Arts Exhibition.

== Career ==
=== Early life and education ===
Born in 1923 in Sōja City, Okayama Prefecture, Seikaku Takagi later enrolled in the former Okayama Prefectural Takahashi Junior High School (now Okayama Prefectural Takahashi High School). Among his classmates was Makoto Munemori, an authority on environmental chemistry who later became an emeritus professor at Osaka Prefecture University. After graduating from the school, Takagi worked at a company and, just before the end of World War II, served for over a year in the military in Tokyo before returning to his hometown.

After the war, he turned to calligraphy as a lifelong pursuit of learning. While working for 20 years at his father's securities firm, he studied under the calligrapher Tsurunobu Uchida in 1947. He researched ancient Chinese and Japanese calligraphy, and he was praised for establishing a modern style that infused deep emotion, particularly as a practitioner of kana calligraphy.

=== Career as a calligrapher ===
Under the guidance of Tsurunobu Uchida, Seikaku Takagi studied classical calligraphy and established his own distinctive style, focusing primarily on kana script. He inherited the Chōyō Calligraphy Association, founded by Uchida, and served as its president for many years.In 1982, he became a member of the Japan Fine Arts Exhibition (Nitten), and in 1991, he was awarded the Prime Minister's Award at the same exhibition. Further recognition followed in 1995 when he received the Japan Art Academy Prize, and in 2006, he was selected as a Person of Cultural Merit. Later, he was awarded the prestigious Order of Culture.

Upon being named a Person of Cultural Merit in 2006, he remarked:

"Kana calligraphy is not merely about conveying meaning through characters; it is an art form that explores sculptural beauty, much like painting. Ink and brush are integral to Japanese culture. Calligraphy is everything to me, and I will devote myself fully to leaving behind great works for future generations."

Even in his later years, he remained active in the calligraphy world, serving as an advisor to the Japan Fine Arts Exhibition, as well as the highest advisor to both the Japanese Calligraphy Institute and the Yomiuri Calligraphy Association.

In February 2017, Seikaku Takagi died at a hospital in Kurashiki City, Okayama Prefecture.

== Evaluation as a calligrapher ==
Seikaku Takagi had a deep connection with Yomiuri Shimbun, which evaluated his work as follows:

*"As a calligrapher, Takagi studied ancient Japanese and Chinese calligraphy, pursuing elegance and refinement in kana script. He established his own distinctive style and made significant contributions to the development of the calligraphy world. He was first selected for the Japan Fine Arts Exhibition (Nitten) in 1950. From 1975, he served as a director of the Japanese Calligraphy Institute, and from 1984, he became a director of the Yomiuri Calligraphy Association, greatly contributing to the advancement of Japanese calligraphy.

▼ Based in Okayama, he studied under Tsurunobu Uchida, the founder of the Chōyō Calligraphy Association. Uchida’s teacher was Seikū Andō, a prominent figure in kana calligraphy, and Takagi fully mastered the calligraphic style of the Motonaga-bon Kokinshū, which was passed down from Seikū. He then delved into the world of ancient calligraphy, studying works such as the Ichijō Sesshō-shū, Kōya-gire, Hari-gire, and Kōgishi-gire, thereby capturing the elegance of the Heian court.

▼ He became one of the leading figures in modern kana calligraphy, in part because he also pioneered new frontiers in large-character kana calligraphy, a style that postwar kana calligraphers sought to develop."*

— Yomiuri Shimbun, Yomiuri Biographical Database

== Brief biography ==
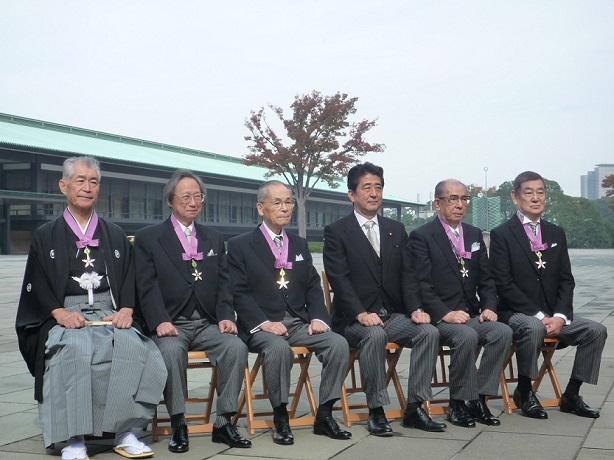
On November 3, 2013, after the conferment of the Order of Culture, a commemorative photo with Tasuku Honjo (far left), Susumu Nakanishi (2nd from the left), Seikaku Takagi (3rd from the left), Shinzo Abe (3rd from the right), Shunichi Iwasaki (2nd from the right), and actor Ken Takakura (far right).

- 1923: Born in Sōja City, Okayama Prefecture.
- 1941: Graduated from Okayama Prefectural Takahashi High School.
- 1947: Became a disciple of calligrapher Tsurunobu Uchida.
- 1950: First selected for the Japan Fine Art Exhibition (Nitten).
- 1981: Served as a Nitten juror (total of 7 times).
- 1991: Became a new member in the Kana of the 20 Contemporary Calligraphers Exhibition.
- 1995: Appointed as Permanent General Affairs Officer of the Yomiuri Calligraphy Association.
  - The same year: Director of Nitten (until 1998).
- 1998, June: Chōyō Calligraphy Association Byōbu Exhibition (Takashimaya Okayama Store).
- 1999: Appointed as managing director of Nitten (until 2000).
- 2000, May: Exhibited at the 2000 Japan Calligraphy Institute Exhibition (Osaka, Temmabashi Matsuzakaya).
- 2001: Appointed as Director of Nitten (until 2003).
- 2003, August: Seikaku Takagi Calligraphy Exhibition – The Beautiful World of Hyakunin Isshu & Miyabi (Wako Hall).
- 2004, May: Seikaku Takagi Calligraphy Exhibition (Okayama, Sun Road Kibiji, hosted by Sōja Cultural Promotion Foundation).
  - The same year: Appointed as Nitten Councilor.
- 2005: Named Honorary Advisor of the Japan Calligraphy Institute.

== Honors and awards ==
- 1998: Fourth Class, Order of the Rising Sun, Gold Rays with Rosette.
- 2004: Dark Blue Ribbon Medal (13th time) and Honorary Citizen of Sōja City.
- 2006, November: Designated as a Person of Cultural Merit.
- 2013, November: Awarded the Order of Culture.
- 2015, September: Dark Blue Ribbon Medal with Rosette and Wooden Cup Set.
- 2017, February 24: Posthumously awarded the Junior Third Rank (Jusanmi).
