= Koji Kinutani =

Japanese Yōga painter (1943–2025)

Order of Culture Koji Kinutani
- 絹谷 幸二
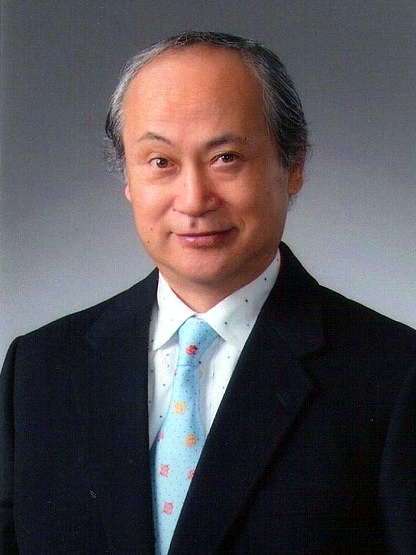
- Kinutani in 2021
- Born: January 24, 1943; Nara City, Japan
- Died: August 1, 2025 (aged 82); Tokyo, Japan
- Education: Tokyo University of the Arts Faculty of Fine Arts
- Known for: Yōga
- Notable work: "Portrait of Mr. Anselmo" (1973) "Portrait of Daria Ganassini" (1975) "Angela and the Blue Sky II" (1976)
- Awards: Yasui Prize (1974); Mainichi Art Award (1989); Japan Art Academy Prize (2001)
- Website: kinutani.jp

Koji Kinutani (Japanese: 絹谷 幸二, January 24, 1943 – August 1, 2025) was a Japanese Yōga painter. He was a recipient of the Order of Culture and a member of the Japan Art Academy. He served as a professor at Osaka University of Arts and as an emeritus professor at Tokyo University of the Arts. He was also recognized as a Person of Cultural Merit.

Kinutani had previously held positions such as professor at Tokyo University of the Arts and director of the Japan Artists Association.

== Life and career ==
=== Early life ===
Kinutani was born in Motoyoshicho, Nara City, Nara Prefecture. He graduated from Nara Prefectural Nara High School and later from Tokyo University of the Arts, majoring in oil painting (1966, under Ryohei Koiso). He won the Ohashi Prize for his graduation work.

=== Career ===
Kinutani began learning oil painting at the age of six. After graduating from university, he studied in Italy in 1971, where he researched classical fresco painting techniques in Venice. In 1974, he received the Yasui Prize for "Portrait of Mr. Anselmo." Following further study in Mexico, he became a professor at Tokyo University of the Arts in 1993, contributing to the education of future artists. He also appeared on NHK's "Sunday Art Museum" and conducted public lectures on fresco techniques to promote understanding of classical Western painting. His works are showcased in solo exhibitions at major department stores across Japan.

In 2000, he became a member of the Japan Art Academy. In 2008, he established the Koji Kinutani Prize, recognizing young artists under 35, with sponsorship from the Mainichi Shimbun. In 2010, he was named an emeritus professor at Tokyo University of the Arts.

=== Death ===
On August 1, 2025, Kinutani died in Tokyo due to malignant lymphoma. He was 82.

== Career milestones ==
- 1987 (Age 44) – Lecturer at Tokyo University of the Arts
- 1989 (Age 46) – Associate Professor at Tokyo University of the Arts
- 1993 (Age 50) – Professor at Tokyo University of the Arts
- 2001 (Age 58) – Member of the Japan Art Academy
- 2009 (Age 66) – Established the Koji Kinutani Prize with the Mainichi Shimbun
- 2010 (Age 67) – Emeritus Professor at Tokyo University of the Arts, Professor at Osaka University of Arts

== Awards ==
- 1966 (Age 23) – Ohashi Prize at the Tokyo University of the Arts graduation exhibition
- 1974 (Age 31) – Yasui Prize for "Portrait of Mr. Anselmo"
- 1989 (Age 46) – Mainichi Art Award
- 2001 (Age 58) – Japan Art Academy Prize for "Blue Skies Dream Tale"

== Honors ==
- 2014 (Age 71) – Person of Cultural Merit
- 2019 (Age 76) – Medal with Dark Blue Ribbon, Wooden Cup Set
- 2021 (Age 78) – Order of Culture

== Major works ==
- "Portrait of Mr. Anselmo" (1973)
- "Portrait of Daria Ganassini" (1975, Niigata City Art Museum)
- "Angela and the Blue Sky II" (1976)
- "Goddess of the Silver Peaks" (1997, Official Poster for the Nagano Winter Olympics)

== Public art and murals ==
Kinutani has created numerous murals and public artworks across Japan, including "VIVA YOKOHAMA" at Yokohama Station and "The Sun of Hope" at the Consulate-General of Japan in New York.

== Publications ==
- The World of Mural Painting (Poplar Publishing, 1983)
- Koji Kinutani Art Book (Kodansha, 1984)
- Koji Kinutani Art Collection (Kyuryudo, 1989)
- The Dream of a 20-Billion-Light-Year Wall (Art Annual Co., 1992)
- Koji Kinutani FUJI-I (Nikkei BP, 1996)
- The Path of the Wind, The Path of Buddha (NHK Publishing, 2003)
