= Hidekazu Yoshida =

Japanese arts critic (1913–2012)

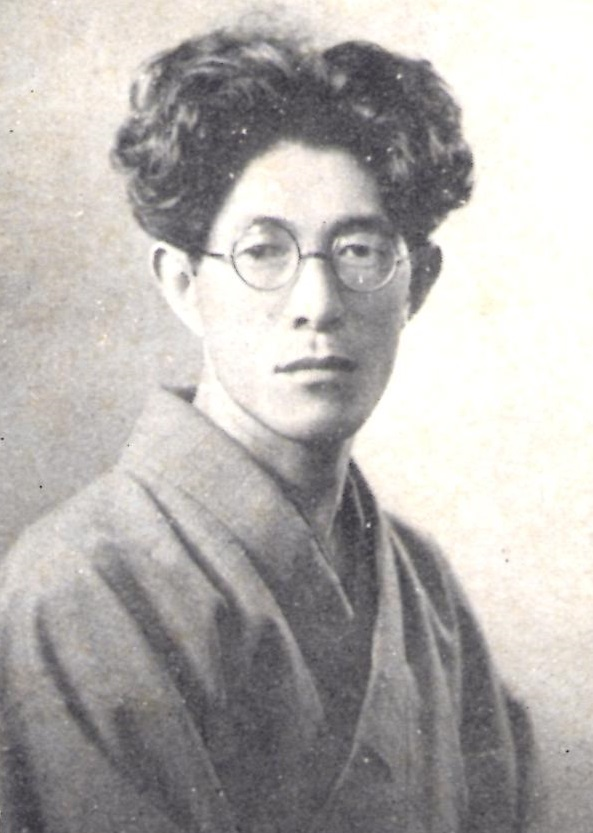
- Yoshida Hidekazu in 1953
- Born: 23 September 1913; Nihonbashi, Tokyo, Empire of Japan
- Died: 22 May 2012 (aged 98); Kamakura, Kanagawa, Japan
- Occupation: Critic

Hidekazu Yoshida (Japanese: 吉田 秀和, romanized: Yoshida Hidekazu; 23 September 1913 – 22 May 2012) was a Japanese music and literary critic whose career spanned the Shōwa and Heisei eras.

== Biography ==
Yoshida was born in Nihonbashi, Tokyo. From an early age, he was interested in languages, and joined in club activities involving English and German when in high school. He was tutored in the French language by noted poet Chūya Nakahara, and corresponded with noted literary critics Hideo Kobayashi and Shōhei Ōoka while still a student. He later graduated from Tokyo Imperial University with a degree in French literature.

His first work of music criticism was a series on Mozart, published in the magazine Ongaku Geijutsu in 1946. In 1948, he helped establish the Toho Gakuen School of Music together with fellow music critics and noted musicians; the school is now one of Japan's most prestigious music institutions.

He made frequent appearances on radio, and later on television, providing commentary on classical music, and on music educational programs.

In 1975, he was awarded the 2nd Osaragi Jizo literary prize for his Yoshino Hideo zenshu ("Collected Poems of Yoshino Hideo"). In 1988, he became director of the Mito Geijutsukan. The same year, he was awarded the Order of the Sacred Treasure, 3rd class and the NHK Culture Award. In 1993, he was awarded the Yomiuri Prize.

In 2006, he received the Order of Culture from the Japanese government. Yoshida died at his home in Kamakura, Kanagawa in 2012 at the age of 98.
