= Sasaki Institute =

Japanese research institute

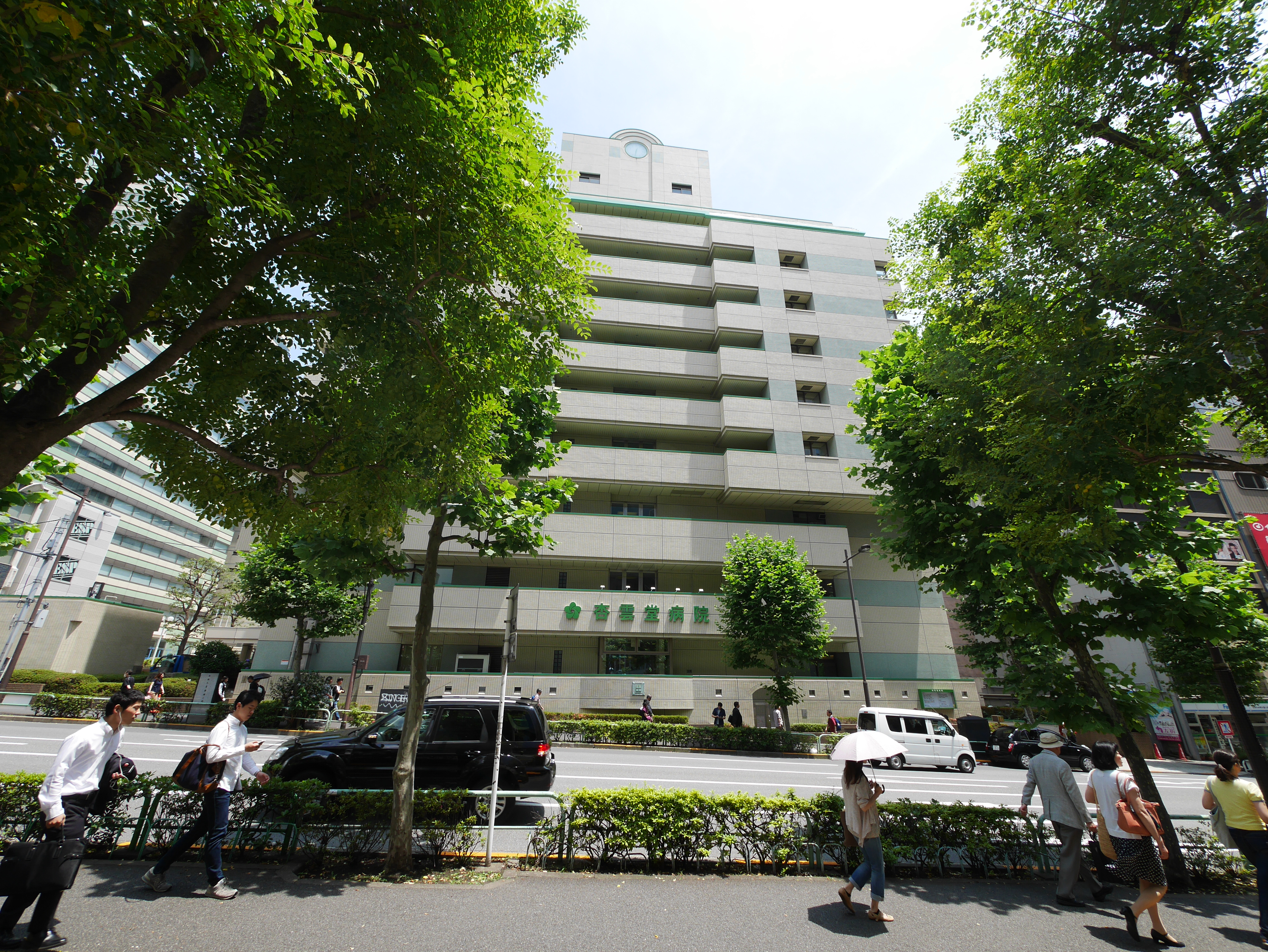
Sasaki Institute, Kyoundo Hospital

The Sasaki Institute (佐々木研究所, Sasaki Kenkyūjo) is an ancillary establishment of the Sasaki Foundation in Chiyoda, Tokyo, involved in cancer research. The present-day Sasaki Institute began as a small private laboratory established in 1894 by Masakichi Sasaki, who was Professor of Medicine at the Tokyo Imperial University.

== History ==
The Sasaki Institute was taken over and expanded by Takaoki Sasaki, who was Professor of Medicine at the Kyoto Imperial University and Masakichi Sasaki's son-in-law. In 1939, Takaoki Sasaki founded the Institute for the Sasaki Foundation in 1939, approved by the Ministry of Education. He became the first president of the foundation and also director of the institute.

== Research ==
Research at the Sasaki Institute covers a wide variety of biomedical fields, including biochemistry, cell biology, pathology, and oncology. Among these research areas, one notable work was "Induction of hepatic cancer in rats by o-aminoazotoluene, one of the azo dyes". This study, published in 1932 by Takaoki Sasaki and Tomizo Yoshida, was the first scientific report in the world on a successful method for induction of cancer in animal organs by feeding chemicals. Research on Yoshida Sarcoma, a strain of tumor cells, was also conducted at this institute in the 1950s.

== List of directors ==
- Takaoki Sasaki (1939 - 1953)
- Tomizo Yoshida (1953 - 1973)
- Hirooki Sasaki (1973 - 1990)
- Motomichi Sasaki (1990 - 1995)
- Yoshiyuki Hashimoto (1995 - 2001)
- Yuji Kurokawa (2001)
- Akihiko Maekawa (2001 - 2006)
- Yuji Kurokawa (2006 - 2010)
- Takao Sekiya (2010 - present)
