= Rizō Takeuchi =

Japanese historian (1907–1997)

Rizō Takeuchi (竹内 理三, Takeuchi Rizō; December 20, 1907–March 2, 1997) was a Japanese historian. He is best known for his work on historical records pertaining to the ancient and Middle Ages of Japanese history.

== Background ==
Takeuchi sik born in Aichi Prefecture on December 20, 1907. He graduated from the Tōkyō Imperial University in 1930 where he studied Japanese history.

== Career ==
Upon graduation, he began work at the Historiographical Institute of the Imperial University of Tokyo, where he eventually became the director in 1965.

He taught at the Kyūshū University, the Historiographical Institute of the University of Tokyo, and Waseda University.

Takeuchi's research focused on temple economic systems, Heian period shōen, and political history of the Ritsuryō state.

Over the course of his career, Takeuchi was awarded several awards for his many contributions to research:

- Asahi Culture Prize, 1957
- Purple Medal Ribbon, 1969
- Order of the Rising Sun, 1978
- Person of Cultural Merit, 1988
- Order of Culture in 1996

== Major works ==
Takeuchi's research produced a number of major books including:

- Nihon Jōdai Jiin Keizai-shi no Kenkyū, 1934
- Jiryō Shōen no Kenkyū, 1942
- Ritsuryōsei to Kizoku Seiken

Of particular significance is his complete collection of historical documents spanning three historical Japanese period:

- Nara Ibun, two volumes, 1943–1944; the 1962 revised edition consists of three volumes
- Heian Ibun, 16 volumes, 1947-1980
- Kamakura Ibun, 46 volumes, 1971-1995
