= Shūji Takashina =

Japanese art historian (1932–2024)

- 高階 秀爾
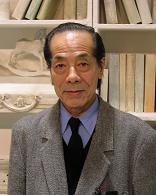
- Takashina in 2004
- Born: 5 February 1932; Tokyo, Japan
- Died: 17 October 2024 (aged 92)
- Education: University of Tokyo; Kyoto University of the Arts; Akita University of Art; University of Paris
- Occupation: Art historian

Shūji Takashina (Japanese: 高階 秀爾 Takashina Shūji; 5 February 1932 – 17 October 2024) was a Japanese art historian and art critic.

== Biography ==
Born in Tokyo on 5 February 1932, Takashina attended the University of Tokyo before studying modern Western art at the University of Paris. From 1959 to 1971, he was curator of the National Museum of Western Art, where he worked until 2002. He was also a professor at the university of Tokyo until 1991.

Takashina died on 17 October 2024, at the age of 92.

== Publications ==
- Seikimatsu geijutsu
- Nihon kindai bijutsushi-ron
- Kindai kaigashi: Goya kara Mondorian made
- Seiokaiga no kindai
- Nihon-kaiga no kindai

== Distinctions ==
- Honorary doctorate from Paris-Sorbonne University (1996)
- Japan Art Academy Prize (2002)
- Person of Cultural Merit (2005)

== Decorations ==
- Commander of the Ordre des Arts et des Lettres (1996)
- Knight of the Legion of Honour (2000)
- Knight of the Order of Merit of the Italian Republic (2003)
- Member of the Order of Culture
