= Yanosuke Otsuka =

Japanese geologist and professor

- 大塚弥之助
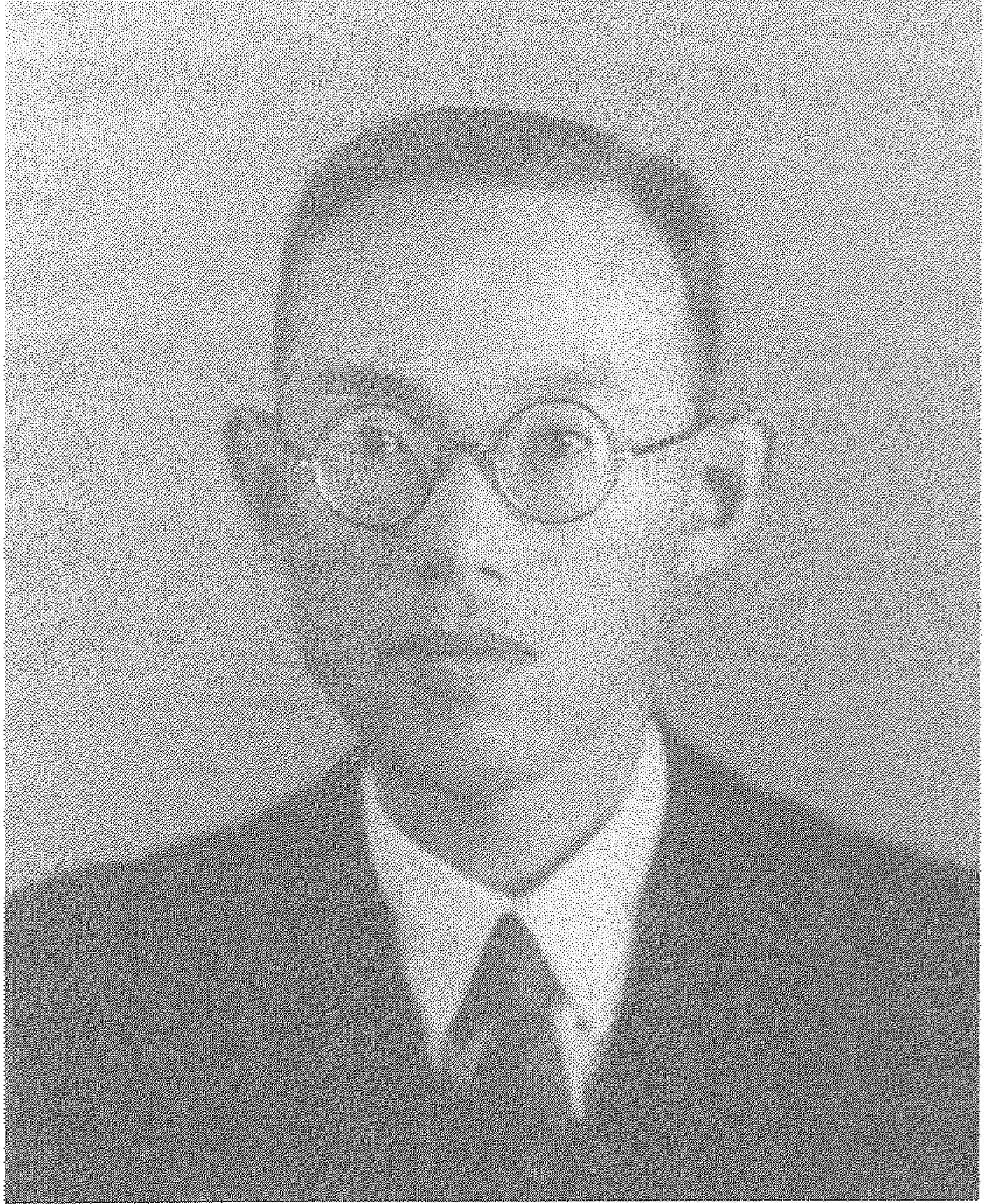
- Yanosuke Otsuka in c. 1940
- Born: 11 July 1903; Tokyo, Japan
- Died: 7 August 1950 (aged 47)
- Spouse: Chieko Otsuka (大塚千枝子)
- Children: Yoshiyuki Otsuka (大塚義之); Natsuko Otsuka (大塚南津子)
- Scientific career
- Fields: Geology

Yanosuke Otsuka

Japanese name
- Hiragana: おおつかやのすけ
- Kyūjitai: 大塚彌之助
- Shinjitai: 大塚弥之助
Transcriptions
- Revised Hepburn: Ōtsuka Yanosuke
- Traditional Hepburn: Ōtsuka Yanosuke
- Kunrei-shiki: Ôtuka Yanosuke
- Nihon-shiki: Ôtuka Yanosuke

Yanosuke Otsuka (大塚弥之助) (11 July 1903 – 7 August 1950) was a Japanese geologist and professor.

Yanosuke Otsuka was born in Nihonbashi, Tokyo on 11 July 1903. He went to the Junior High School attached to Tokyo Higher Normal School (東京高等師範学校付属中学校), and after that to Shizuoka High School (静岡高校). For his undergraduate studies, he entered the Department of Geology, Faculty of Science, Imperial University of Tokyo, where he graduated in 1929. While he was student, he learned the methods of historical geology from Yoshiaki Ozawa, topography from Taro Tsujimura (辻村太郎), and Cenozoic biological stratigraphy from Shigeyasu Tokunaga. After graduation, he entered the Earthquake Research Institute as an assistant in 1930, becoming an associate professor in 1939 and a professor in 1943. He made significant contributions in characterizing the surface faults in the circum-Pacific area, effects of tsunamis, tectonics of crustal movements, taxonomy of molluscs, paleoclimatology, mapping of Cenozoic strata, and the Tertiary history of the Japanese islands. He died prematurely from pulmonary tuberculosis on 7 August 1950, at the age of 47, because effective antimicrobial therapy was not yet available in Japan at the time.

In biology, he is known for the Otsuka similarity coefficient (also known as Otsuka-Ochiai or Ochiai coefficient), which can be represented as:

$$K =\frac{|A \cap B|}{\sqrt{|A| \times |B|}}$$

Here, $A$ and $B$ are sets, and $|A|$ is the number of elements in $A$. If sets are represented as bit vectors, the Otsuka similarity coefficient can be seen to be the same as the cosine similarity. In a recent book, the Otsuka similarity coefficient is misattributed to another Japanese researcher with the family name Otsuka. The confusion arises because in 1957 Akira Ochiai attributes the coefficient only to Otsuka (no first name mentioned) by citing an article by Ikuso Hamai (Japanese: 浜井 生三), who in turn cites the original 1936 article by Yanosuke Otsuka.
