= Mitsuhiro Yanagida =

Japanese molecular biologist (born 1941)

- 柳田 充弘
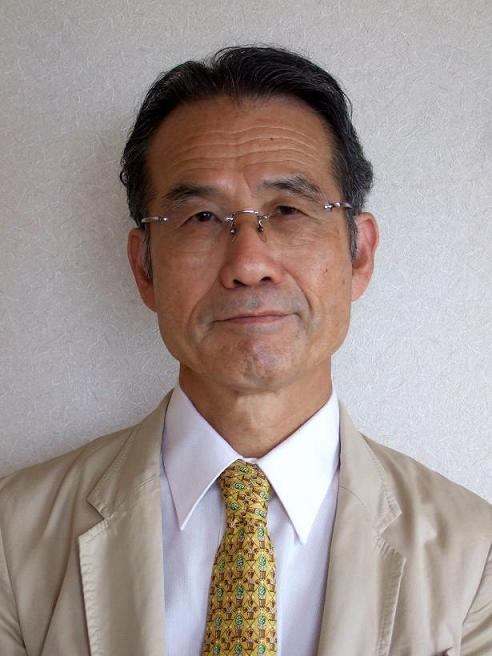
- the photo published by the Ministry of Education, Culture, Sports, Science and Technology
- Education: University of Tokyo
- Known for: Cell Cycle; Chromosome segregation
- Awards: Order of Culture (2011); Imperial Prize of the Japan Academy (2003); Asahi Prize (2000)
- Scientific career
- Fields: Molecular biology Cell biology
- Workplaces: Okinawa Institute of Science and Technology; Kyoto University

Mitsuhiro Yanagida ForMemRS (柳田充弘, Yanagida Mitsuhiro; born April 4, 1941, in Tokyo) is a Japanese molecular biologist known for research on cell cycle and chromosome structure using the fission yeast Schizosaccharomyces pombe. He was elected as a foreign member of the Royal Society on 11 May 2000.

== Education and early life ==
Yanagida was born in Tokyo, and received his doctorate in science from the University of Tokyo in 1970.

== Career and research ==
He was Professor of Biophysics at Kyoto University from 1977 to 2004, where he served as Dean of Graduate School of Biostudies from 2001 to 2003. After retiring from Kyoto University and becoming Professor Emeritus, he has been Professor of the G0 Cell Unit at the Okinawa Institute of Science and Technology.

== Awards and honors ==
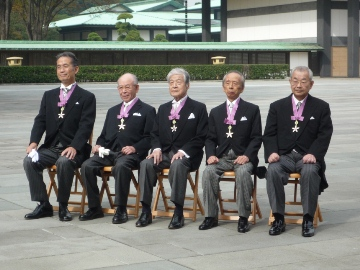
Yanagida received the Order of Culture. After that, they posed for the photo. (at the East Garden of the Tokyo Imperial Palace on November 3, 2011)

Yanagida is an Honorary Fellow of the Society of Biology since 2010 and foreign associate of the National Academy of Sciences, USA since 2012.

He received many awards including the Order of Culture (2011) and the Imperial Prize of the Japan Academy (2003).
