= Toshio Yodoi =

Japanese sculptor (1911–2005)

- 淀井 敏夫
- Born: February 15, 1911; Asago, Hyōgo, Japan
- Died: February 14, 2005 (aged 93)
- Education: Tokyo University of the Arts
- Occupation: Sculptor

Toshio Yodoi (淀井 敏夫, Yodoi Toshio; February 15, 1911 – February 14, 2005) was a Japanese sculptor, and a pioneer of Japanese modern and contemporary arts. In 1994, he was officially recognized by the Japanese government as a "Person of Cultural Merit" and in 2001, the Order of Culture was conferred.

== Early life ==
Toshio was born in 1911 in Asago in Hyōgo Prefecture. He was a 1933 graduate of the Tokyo School of Fine Arts.

== Honors ==
Emperor Akihito personally conferred the Order of Culture on sculptor Toshio Yodoi as Prime Minister Junichiro Koizumi looked on. Only the highest-ranking awards, such as this rare honor, are bestowed personally by the emperor.

- 2001 – Order of Culture.
- 1994 – Person of Cultural Merit.
