= Noboru Kousaka =

Japanese politician

- 上坂 昇

Member of the House of Representatives
- In office 10 December 1972 – 24 January 1990
- Preceded by: Kanemitsu Tabata
- Succeeded by: Hisashi Suzuki
- Constituency: Fukushima 3rd

Personal details
- Born: 6 July 1918 Iwaki, Fukushima, Japan
- Died: 2 July 2013 (aged 94)
- Party: Socialist
- Education: Waseda University

Noboru Kousaka (上坂 昇, Kōsaka Noboru; 6 July 1918 – 2 July 2013) was a Japanese politician. He was a member of the House of Representatives for the Japan Socialist Party from 1973 until his retirement in 1991.
