= Noboru Niida =

- Born: January 1, 1904; Sendai, Miyagi, Japan
- Died: June 22, 1966 (aged 62); Tokyo
- Other name: 仁井田 陞
- Occupation: Chinese history

Noboru Niida (仁井田陞, Niida Noboru; January 1, 1904 - June 22, 1966) was a Japanese academic, historian of Chinese legal history and Professor Emeritus of Oriental Laws at the University of Tokyo (Todai).

== Biography ==
In 1925, Niida began his studies at the University of Tokyo, where he would eventually be awarded his doctorate. Niida was a professor and legal history scholar at the University of Tokyo. Among the students he influenced was Denis Twitchett, who studied with him in Tokyo in 1953-54. He is known for having written Chinese legal System (中國法制史, Chūgoku hōsei shi) which has been the subject of a multi-year process of translation into English.

== Selected works ==
In a statistical overview derived from writings by and about Naboru Niida, OCLC/WorldCat encompasses roughly 100+ works in 200+ publications in 5 languages and 900+ library holdings.

- 唐令拾遺 (1933)
- 中國の社會とギルド (1951)
- 中國の農村家族 (1952)
- 中國農村慣行調 (1952)
- 中國法制史 (1952)
- 中国の法と社會と歷史: 遺稿集 (1966)
- 中国の伝統と革命: 仁井田陞集 (1974)

== Honors ==
- Imperial Academy, Imperial Prize, 1934 for A Reconstruction of the Administrative and Civil Code of the Tang Dynasty
