= Churyo Sato =

Japanese sculptor (1912–2011)

- 佐藤 忠良
- Born: 1911; Miyagi Prefecture, Japan
- Died: 30 March 2011 (aged 99–100)
- Other name: Satō Chūryō
- Occupations: Sculptor, painter

Churyo Sato (佐藤 忠良, Satō Chūryō) (1912 – 30 March 2011) was a Japanese sculptor and painter.

== Early life ad education ==
Sato was born in Miyagi Prefecture and grew up in Hokkaido. In 1932 he moved to Tokyo to become a painter. Becoming influenced by Aristide Maillol and Charles Despiau, Sato decided to specialize in sculpture. He graduated from the Tokyo School of Fine Arts.

== Career ==
Beginning in 1934, Sato spent seventy years making art works, primarily bronze sculptures. He designed the official medal of the 1970 World Exposition in Osaka, featuring a stylized cherry blossom and a budding tree. The first two exhibits of Sato's work outside Japan were at the Musée Rodin in Paris in 1981, and at Wildenstein & Company in New York City in 1983.

Sato died on 30 March 2011 at the age of 98.
