= Imperial Prize of the Japan Academy =

Japanese award

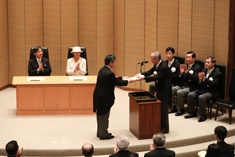
The Award Ceremony for the Imperial Prize and Japan Academy Prize (at the Building of Japan Academy on June 17, 2019)

The Imperial Prize of the Japan Academy (恩賜賞, onshishō) is an honor conferred to two of the recipients of the Japan Academy Prize.

== Overviews ==
It is awarded in two categories: humanities and natural sciences. The Emperor and Empress visit the awarding ceremony and present a vase to the awardees.

== Laureates ==
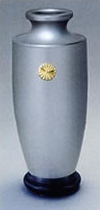
The Imperial Prize winner receives the Gomontsuki Ginkabin.

- 2020 — Mitinori Saitou (110th)
- 2019 — Makoto Fujita (109th)
- 2018 — Takeshi Matsuura, Chikashi Toyoshima (108th)
- 2017 — Akira Hasegawa (107th)
- 2016 — Kazutoshi Mori (106th)
- 2015 — Hideo Hosono
- 2014 — Isamu Akasaki
- 2013 — Jun Matsuura, Yoshinori Tokura
- 2012 — Kazuyoshi Yoshikawa, Keiichi Namba
- 2011 — Akira Satake, Hideaki Miyata (101st)
- 2010 — Akira Omote, Shinya Yamanaka (100th)
- 2009 — Tetumi Murakami, Toru Eguchi (99th)
- 2008 — Keiji Morokuma (98th)
- 2007 — Senzo Hidemura, Shizuo Akira (97th)
- 2006 — Shuh Narumiya (96th)
- 2005 — Kazuya Kato (95th)
- 2004 — Chikahi Suma, Takeshi Yasumoto (94th)
- 2003 — Mitsuhiro Yanagida (93rd)
- 2002 — Takahiro Fujimoto, Sumio Iijima (92nd)
- 2001 — Fumio Hayashi, Makoto Asashima (91st)
- 2000 — Tsugitaka Sato, Shigekazu Nagata (90th)
- 1999 — Susumu Fuma, Yoshito Kishi (89th)
- 1998 — Toshio Yanagida (88th)
- 1997 — Shigetada Nakanishi (87th)
- 1996 — Tasuku Honjo (86th)
- 1995 — Toru Mineya, Yoshio Fukao (85th)
- 1994 — Makoto Kumada, Hideki Sakurai (84th)
- 1993 — Issei Tanaka, Yasuo Tanaka (83rd)
- 1992 — Chushichi Tsuzuki, Tadamitsu Kishimoto (82nd)
- 1991 — Yoshinori Kobayashi, Akira Tonomura (81st)
- 1990 — Koji Nakanishi (80th)
- 1989 — Tomi Saeki, Yorio Hinuma (79th)
- 1988 — Susumu Nishimura (78th)
- 1987 — Toshio Fukuyama, Toshimitsu Yamazaki (77th)
- 1986 — Masao Ito (76th)
- 1985 — Ryo Sato (75th)
- 1984 — Seizen Nakasone, Gakuzo Tamura (74th)
- 1983 — Teruaki Mukaiyama (73rd)
- 1982 — Kokiti Hara, Shizuo Kakutani (72nd)
- 1981 — Yasuiti Nagano (71st)
- 1980 — Yoshio Okada (70th)
- 1979 — Yoshihide Kozai (69th)
- 1978 — Kiyoshi Itō (68th)
- 1977 — Shinji Takahashi (67th)
- 1976 — Takashi Sugimura (66th)
- 1975 — Jikido Takasaki, Minoru Oda (65th)
- 1974 — Tsugio Mikami, Kimishige Ishizaka (64th)
- 1973 — Takuichi Takeshima, Jun Kondo (63rd)
- 1972 — Tadashi Matsushita, Setsuro Ebashi (62nd)
- 1971 — Mataji Miyamoto, Chushiro Hayashi (61st)
- 1970 — Hidetaka Nakamura, Seizo Okamura (60th)
- 1969 — Ryogo Kubo (59th)
- 1968 — Tatsuo Nishida (58th)
- 1967 — Kōsaku Yosida (57th)
- 1966 — Egaku Mayeda (56th)
- 1965 — Noriyuki Kojima (55th)
- 1964 — Kiyoshi Mutō (54th)
- 1963 — Takeo Nagamiya (53rd)
- 1962 — Tomoichi Sasabuchi (52nd)
- 1961 — Shigeo Okinaka (51st)
- 1960 — Osamu Takata, Takuji Ito, Kazuo Yamasaki, Aki Uyeno, Taka Yanagisawa, Tsugio Miya (50th)
- 1959 — Isao Imai (49th)
- 1958 — Ryozo Niizeki (48th)
- 1957 — Hajime Nakamura (47th)
- 1956 — Masuzo Shikata, Isamu Tachi (46th)
- 1955 — Yoshio Fujita (45th)
- 1954 — Jitsuzo Tamura, Yukio Kobayashi (44th)
- 1953 — Tomizo Yoshida (43rd)
- 1952 — Seiichi Mizuno, Toshio Nagahiro (42nd)
- 1951 — Yoshiyuki Toyama (41st)
- 1950 — Shoichi Sakata (40th)
- 1949 — Kakuji Goto (39th)
- 1948 — Saburo Ienaga (38th)
- 1947 — Takeo Matsumura (37th)
- 1946 — Hakaru Masumoto (36th)
- 1945 — Tokuhichi Mishima, Kyôji Funada, Takahiro Okuno (35th)
- 1944 — Tomosaburo Ogata (34th)
- 1943 — Junpei Shinobu, Tanemoto Furuhata, Hitoshi Kihara (33rd), Morizo Ishidate
- 1942 — Enku Uno (32nd)
- 1941 — Eiichi Matsumoto, Kinjiro Okabe, Yas Kuno, Ukichiro Nakaya (31st)
- 1940 — Asaji Nose, Hideki Yukawa, Juro Horiuti (30th)
- 1939 — Ken Ishikawa, Ken Kure (29th)
- 1938 — No award (28th)
- 1937 — Shinkichi Horiba, Yasujiro Niwa (27th)
- 1936 — Hisayosi Ogawa, Takaoki Sasaki, Tomizo Yoshida (26th)
- 1935 — Shimpei Ogura, Shinsho Hanayama (25th)
- 1934 — Noboru Niida, Seitaro Tsuboi (24th)
- 1933 — Ziro Tuzi, Bunsuke Suzuki (23rd)
- 1932 — Kyōsuke Kindaichi, Kiyoo Wadati (22nd)
- 1931 — Katsutada Sezawa (21st)
- 1930 — Buntaro Adachi (20th)
- 1929 — Toshi Shida (19th)
- 1928 — Masao Kambe, Sōichi Kakeya (18th)
- 1927 — Shigeru Kato, Yuji Shibata (17th)
- 1926 — Yorisuke Numata, Yoshiaki Ozawa (16th)
- 1925 — Keiki Yabuki, Nagaho Mononobe (15th)
- 1924 — Kuniji Yashiro, Takaoki Sasaki (14th)
- 1923 — Iichiro Tokutomi, Shigematsu Kakimura, Yasuhiko Asahina, Suekichi Kinoshita (13th)
- 1922 — Toshio Takamine, Usaburo Yoshida (12th)
- 1921 — Zennosuke Tsuji, Gennosuke Fuse (11th)
- 1920 — Kaneyuki Miura, Mitsumaru Tsujimoto (10th)
- 1919 — Jun Ishiwara (9th)
- 1918 — Hidematsu Wada, Taiken Kimura, Keita Shibata (8th)
- 1917 — Torahiko Terada, Sasaki Nobutsuna (7th)
- 1916 — Toru Oya, Taisuke Hayashi, Ryokichi Inada, Yasushi Ido (6th)
- 1915 — Hideyo Noguchi (5th)
- 1914 — Sunao Tawara (4th)
- 1913 — Ryosuke Muraoka, Kumakatsu Kosaka (3rd)
- 1912 — Nagao Ariga, Yu Fujikawa, Sakugoro Hirase, Seiichiro Ikeno (2nd)
- 1911 — Hisashi Kimura (1st)

== See also ==
- Japan Academy Prize (academics)
