= Ozawa Yoshiaki =

Japanese paleontologist

Yoshiaki Ozawa (小沢 儀明, Ozawa Yoshiaki)
- Born: March 31, 1899; Higashiyamanashi District, Yamanashi
- Died: December 28, 1929 (aged 30); Japan
- Occupations: paleontologist, geologist
- Years active: 1923-1929
- Spouse: unknown (married since at least 1928)
- Awards: Imperial Prize of the Japan Academy (1926)

Yoshiaki Ozawa (小沢 儀明, Ozawa Yoshiaki) was a paleontologist and geologist. After graduating from the University of Tokyo (when Tokyo Imperial University in 1923, Ozawa was hired by faculty as an assistant and become a full-time lecturer next year. His early work earned him a fellowship in the Geological Society of Japan and proved that Akiyoshi plateau had a reverse stratigraphy. He became an associate professor in 1925 and got the Imperial Prize of the Japan Academy in 1926. The foraminifera genus "Staffella Ozawa" is named after him.

Ozawa with his wife received a grant to travel to Europe (England, Austria, Italy, Switzerland and France) and United States in 1927, collaborating with the Massachusetts researcher Joseph Augustine Cushman. During that period and after return to Japan Ozawa performed mostly foraminifera research, both gathering his own samples and analyzing samples of other researchers.

Five months after his return in Japan, Ozawa contracted typhoid fever and died 29 December 1929.

Afterward, the Geological Society of Japan established "The Geological Society of Japan Ozawa Yoshiaki Award" which is granted to young (under 37 years old) scientists for exceptional contribution to the field of geology.

== Bibliography ==
- Ozawa Y., "The post-Paleozoic and late-Mesozoic earth-movements in the inner zone of Japan", Koto Commemoration volume 1925
- Ozawa Yoshiaki, "On the classification of Fusulinidae", Journal of the College of Science, Imperial University of Tokyo, vol. 45, art. 4, pp. 1–26
- Ozawa Yoshiaki, "Paleontological and Stratigraphical Studies on the Permo-Carboniferous Limestone of Nagato", Part 2. Paleontology. Journal of the College of Science, Imperial University of Tokyo. vol. 45 art.6 pp. 1–90
- Ozawa Y., "A new genus, Depratella, and its relation to Endothyra", Contributions from the Cushman Laboratory for Foraminiferal Research vol. 4, part 1, pp. 9–10, March 1928
- Ozawa Y. et al., "An outline of a revision of the poly-mophinidae", Contributions from the Cushman Laboratory for Foraminiferal Research vol. 4, part 1, pp. 13–20, March 1928

(full bibliography of 'Ozawa Yoshiaki comprise at least 45 publications)
