= Order of Culture =

Japanese order

Order of Culture 文化勲章
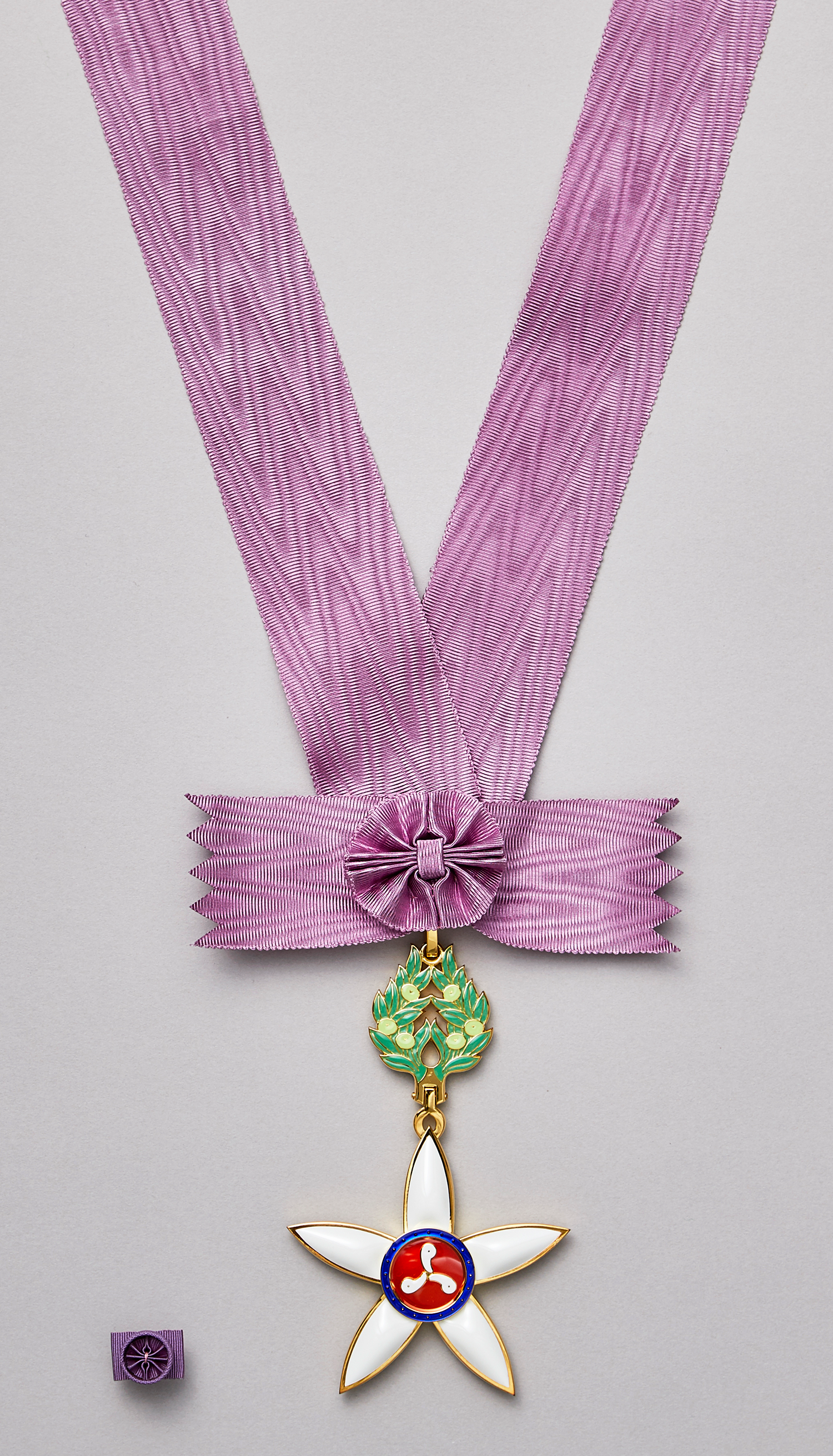
- Neck order of the award

Awarded by the Emperor of Japan
- Type: Order
- Awarded for: contributions to Japanese art, literature, or culture
- Status: Currently constituted
- Sovereign: HM The Emperor
- Grades: Member

Precedence
- Next (higher): Order of the Paulownia Flowers
- Next (lower): Person of Cultural Merit; Medals of Honor
- Equivalent: Order of the Rising Sun (Grand Cordon); Order of the Sacred Treasure (Grand Cordon); Order of the Precious Crown (Grand Cordon)
- Ribbon of the order

The Order of Culture (文化勲章, Bunka-kunshō) is a Japanese order, established on February 11, 1937. The order has one class only, and may be awarded to men and women for contributions to Japan's art, literature, science, technology, or anything related to culture in general; recipients of the order also receive an annuity for life. The order is conferred by the Emperor of Japan in person on Culture Day (November 3) each year. It is considered equivalent to the highest rank (Grand Cordon) of the Order of the Rising Sun, the Order of the Sacred Treasure, and the Order of the Precious Crown. The only orders that Japanese emperors bestow on recipients by their own hands are the Collar of the Supreme Order of the Chrysanthemum, the Grand Cordon of each order, and the Order of Culture.

The badge of the order, which is in gold with white enamel, is in the form of a Tachibana orange blossom; the central disc bears three crescent-shaped jades (magatama). The badge is suspended on a gold and enamel wreath of mandarin orange leaves and fruit, which is in turn suspended on a purple ribbon worn around the neck.

== System of recognition ==
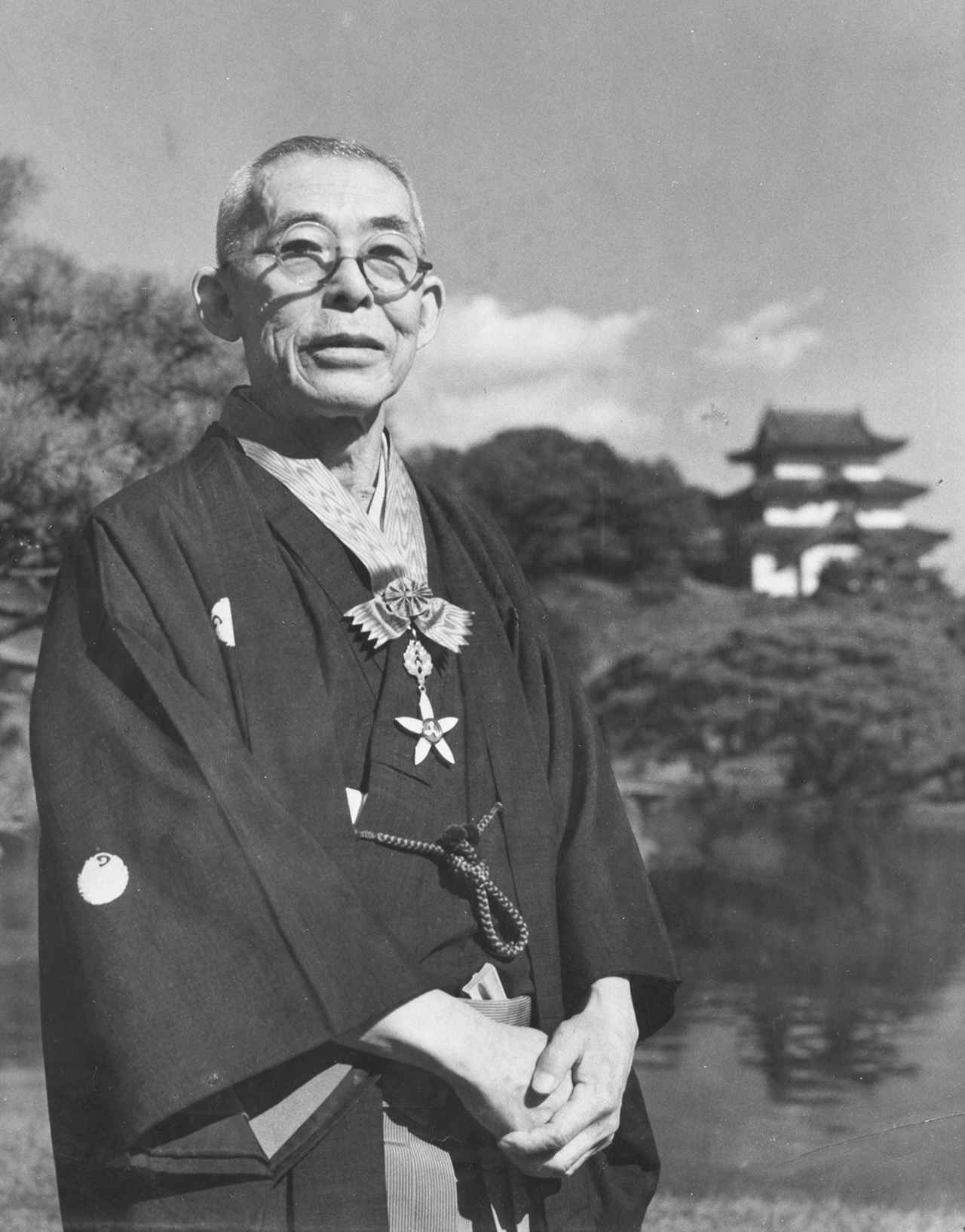
Kabuki actor Nakamura Kichiemon I was awarded the Order of Culture in 1951. He was the first kabuki performer to be accorded this honor.

The Order of Culture and Persons of Cultural Merit function together in honoring contributions to the advancement and development of Japanese culture in a variety of fields such as academia, arts and others.

=== Order of Culture ===
The Emperor himself presents the honor at the award ceremony, which takes place at the Imperial Palace on the Day of Culture (November 3). Candidates for the Order of Culture are selected from the Persons of Cultural Merit by the Minister of Education, Culture, Sports, Science and Technology, upon hearing views of all the members of the selection committee for the Persons of Cultural Merit. The Minister then recommends the candidates to the Prime Minister so that they can be decided by the Cabinet.

=== Persons of Cultural Merit ===
The system for Persons of Cultural Merit was established in 1951 by the Law on Pensions for the Persons of Cultural Merit. Since the Constitution of Japan stipulates that "No privilege shall accompany any award of honor, decoration or any distinction" (Article 14), the government is not allowed to provide pensions or rewards to recipients of the Order of Culture. The purpose is to honor persons of cultural merit (including recipients of the Order of Culture) by providing a special government-sponsored pension (3.5 million yen per year). Since 1955, the new honorees have been announced on the Day of Culture, the same day as the award ceremony for the Order of Culture.

== Selected recipients ==
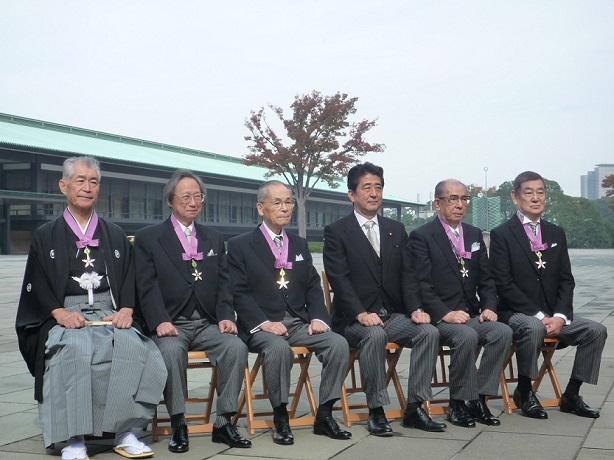
From left to right: Tasuku Honjo, Susumu Nakanishi, Seikaku Takagi, Prime Minister Shinzō Abe, Shun-ichi Iwasaki, and Ken Takakura

A complete list can be found here.

- Akira Ifukube (1914–2006). A composer of classical music and film scores.
- Ryukichi Inada (1874–1950). A physician, a prominent academic, and bacteriologist researcher.
- Hideo Kobayashi (1902–1983). An author, who established literary criticism as an independent art form in Japan.
- Akira Kurosawa (1910-1998). A world-famous film director and painter.
- Hantaro Nagaoka (1865–1950). A physicist and a pioneer of Japanese physics in the early Meiji period.
- Nakamura Kichiemon I (1896–1954). 1st kabuki actor to receive this honor.
- Nakamura Utaemon VI (1917–2001). A famous kabuki actor, known for his oyama roles.
- Kaii Higashiyama (1908–1999). A famous artist and writer, renowned for his Nihonga style paintings.
- Kinjiro Okabe (1896–1984). An electrical engineering researcher and professor who developed the split-anode magnetron.
- Jirō Osaragi (1897–1973). A popular writer in Shōwa period.
- Junjiro Takakusu (1866–1945). An academic, an advocate for expanding higher education opportunities, and an internationally known Buddhist scholar.
- Kenjiro Takayanagi (1899–1990). A pioneer in the development of television.
- Morohashi Tetsuji (1883–1982). An important figure in the world of Japanese studies and Sinology.
- Susumu Tonegawa (born 1939). A scientist who won the Nobel Prize for Physiology or Medicine in 1987.
- Eiji Yoshikawa (1892–1962). A historical novelist.
- Yasunari Kawabata (1899–1972). A novelist who won the Nobel Prize for Literature in 1968.

=== 1990s ===
==== 1992 ====
- Masaru Ibuka (1908–1997). Co-founder, President and Chairman of Sony Corporation.

==== 1994 ====
- Takashi Asahina (1908–2001). Orchestral conductor.
- Tadao Umesao (1920–2010). Ethnologist.
- Hideo Shima (1901–1998). Railway engineer.

==== 1995 ====
- Shigemitsu Dandō (1913–2012). Criminologist.
- Shūsaku Endō (1923–1996). Writer.

==== 1996 ====
- Hanae Mori (1926–2022). Fashion designer.
- Rizō Takeuchi (1907–1997). Historian of Japan.

==== 1997 ====
- Masatoshi Koshiba (1926–2020). Nobel Prize-winning physicist.
- Hirofumi Uzawa (1928–2014). Economist.

==== 1998 ====
- Ikuo Hirayama (1930–2009). Nihonga artist.
- Tadamitsu Kishimoto (born 1939). Immunologist.

==== 1999 ====
- Hiroyuki Agawa (1920–2015). Writer.
- Fuku Akino (1908–2001). Nihonga artist.
- Takeshi Umehara (1925–2019). Scholar of Japanese cultural studies.

=== 2000s ===
==== 2000 ====
- Ryōji Noyori (born 1938). Nobel Prize-winning chemist.
- Hideki Shirakawa (born 1936). Nobel Prize-winning chemist.
- Isuzu Yamada (1917–2012). Actress.

==== 2001 ====
- Chie Nakane (1926–2021). Social anthropologist.
- Toshio Yodoi (1911–2005). Sculptor.
- Hiroo Inokuchi (1927–2014). Chemist.

==== 2002 ====
- Kyōhei Fujita (1921–2004). Glass artist.
- Kaneto Shindō. Film director.
- Kōichi Tanaka. Nobel Prize-winning scientist.

==== 2003 ====
- Kazuhiko Nishijima (1926–2009). Physicist.
- Sadako Ogata. Political scientist and diplomat.
- Makoto Ōoka. Poet and literary critic.

==== 2004 ====
- Yōji Totsuka (1942–2008). Physicist.
- Nakamura Jakuemon, Kabuki actor.
- Toan Kobayashi, Seal carver.
- Shizuka Shirakawa, Scholar of Chinese-language literature.
- Horin Fukoji, Nihonga painter.

==== 2005 ====
- Mitsuko Mori. Actress.
- Makoto Saitō (1921–2008). Political scientist, specializing in American diplomatic and political history.
- Ryuzan Aoki, Ceramic artist.
- Toshio Sawada, Civil engineer.
- Shigeaki Hinohara, Doctor.

==== 2006 ====
- Yoshiaki Arata. A pioneer of nuclear fusion research.
- Jakuchō Setouchi. Writer/Buddhist nun.
- Hidekazu Yoshida. Music critic.
- Chusaku Oyama, Nihonga painter.
- Miyohei Shinohara, Economist.

==== 2007 ====
- Akira Mikazuki. Former justice minister and professor emeritus.
- Shinya Nakamura. Sculptor.
- Kōji Nakanishi. Organic chemist.
- Tokindo Okada, Developmental biologist.
- Shigeyama Sensaku, Kyogen performer.

==== 2008 ====
- Hironoshin Furuhashi (1928–2009). Sportsman and sports bureaucrat.
- Kiyoshi Itō. A mathematician whose work is now called Itō calculus.
- Donald Keene. A Japanologist, scholar, teacher, writer, translator and interpreter of Japanese literature and culture.
- Makoto Kobayashi. A physicist who was awarded the 2008 Nobel Prize in Physics.
- Toshihide Masukawa. A theoretical physicist who was awarded the 2008 Nobel Prize in Physics.
- Seiji Ozawa. A conductor, particularly noted for his interpretations of large-scale late Romantic works.
- Osamu Shimomura. An organic chemist and marine biologist who was awarded the 2008 Nobel Prize in Chemistry.
- Seiko Tanabe. Author.

==== 2009 ====
- Sumio Iijima. Physicist.
- Tōjūrō Sakata IV. Kabuki actor.
- Katsura Beicho, Rakugo performer.
- Akira Hayami, Economist, Historian.
- Yorio Hinuma, Virologist.

=== 2010s ===
==== 2010 ====
- Tadao Ando. Architect.
- Akito Arima. Nuclear physicist.
- Issei Miyake. Fashion designer.
- Eiichi Negishi. Chemistry Nobel Prize laureate.
- Yukio Ninagawa. Stage director.
- Akira Suzuki. Chemistry Nobel Prize laureate.
- Haruko Wakita. Medieval historian.

==== 2011 ====
- Isamu Akasaki, Engineer.
- Ōhi Chōzaemon, potter.
- Saiichi Maruya, Author.
- Taichirō Mitani, Political and history scholar.
- Mitsuhiro Yanagida, Molecular biologist.

==== 2012 ====
- Shigeru Oda, Jurist, a judge on the International Court of Justice from 1976 to 2003.
- Yoji Yamada, Film Director.
- Shinya Yamanaka, Physiology Nobel Prize laureate, biologist.
- Shūji Takashina, art critic.
- Toshio Matsuo, nihonga painter.
- Yasuyuki Yamada, agronomist.

==== 2013 ====
- Ken Takakura, noted Japanese actor.
- Susumu Nakanishi, noted scholar of Japanese literature.
- Shunichi Iwasaki, noted scholar of electrical engineering.
- Seikaku Takagi, noted Japanese calligrapher.
- Tasuku Honjo, noted immunologist

==== 2014 ====
- Hiroshi Amano, Physics Nobel Prize laureate in 2014.
- Shuji Nakamura, Physics Nobel Prize laureate in 2014.
- Sumitayū Takemoto, narrator of Japanese bunraku, also known as a “ningyo joruri” (puppet theater).
- Taeko Kōno, writer and critic and is considered one of the most important contemporary writers of modern Japanese literature.
- Toyoki Kunitake, researcher in molecular architecture.
- Takashi Negishi, economist.
- Gyoji Nomiyama, Western-style painter.

=== 2020s ===
==== 2021 ====
- Syukuro Manabe, Nobel Prize winning climatologist.
- Shigeo Nagashima, noted former Japanese baseball player.
- Onoe Kikugoro VII, Kabuki actor.
- Tsuneko Okazaki, Molecular biology researcher.
- Hirohiko Okano, Japanese tanka poet.
- Junzo Kawada, Anthropologist.
- Koji Kinutani, Painter.
- Shigefumi Mori, Mathematician.
- Asami Maki, Ballet dancer.

==== 2022 ====
- Atsushi Uemura, nihonga painter.
- Hiroyuki Sakaki, electronic engineer.
- Teruhiko Beppu, microbiologist.
- Matsumoto Hakuō II, kabuki player.
- Yamase Shōin, koto player.
- Tadao Yoshikawa, Oriental historian.

==== 2023 ====
- Mansaku Nomura, kyogen player.
- Keidō Ishige, calligrapher.
- Katsuhito Iwai, economist.
- Saburō Kawabuchi, football player, president of the Japan Football Association
- Nanami Shiono, novelist.
- Tadatsugu Taniguchi, immunologist.
- Kōhei Tamao, organic chemist.

==== 2024 ====
- Kenjirō Egashira, jurist.
- Mutsuo Takahashi, poet.
- Toshio Tabuchi, nihonga painter.
- Tetsuya Chiba, manga artist.
- Tsuyoshi Tsutsumi, cellist.
- Junko Nakanishi, environmental engineer.
- Nobutaka Hirokawa, cell biologist.

==== 2025 ====
- Sadaharu Oh, former baseball player, manager, and current President of baseball operations for the Fukuoka SoftBank Hawks.
- Susumu Kitagawa, Kyoto University professor, winner of the 2025 Nobel Prize in Chemistry.
- Junko Koshino, fashion designer.
- Yasunaru Kawashima, professor emeritus of cardiovascular surgery at Osaka University.
- Kataoka Nizaemon XV, Kabuki state actor
- Kazuhiko Komatsu, cultural anthropologist
- Nobuo Tsuji, art historian
- Hisashi Yamamoto, chemist

==== 2026 ====
- Motoko Ishii, lighting designer
- Toyo Ito, architect
- Tsuneyoshi Kuroiwa, biologist who researched intracellular organelles
- Tetsuya Shiokawa, scholar of religion and French literature
- Kensō Soai, organic chemist
- Shunichi Tokura, composer
- Shigekazu Nagata, biochemist
- Shigeru Miyamoto, game designer and creator of Mario, The Legend of Zelda, Donkey Kong, Star Fox, and Pikmin

=== Known to have declined the honor ===
- Kenzaburō Ōe, 1994 Nobel laureate and critic of the Japanese Imperial system.
- Haruko Sugimura, actress.

== See also ==
- Order of Merit (UK)
- Pour le Mérite (Germany; recognised by the state, though not a state order)
- Ordre des Palmes Académiques (France)
- Order of Saint Catherine the Great Martyr (Russia)
- Order of Honour (Russia)
- Civil Order of Alfonso X, the Wise (Spain)
- Italian Order of Merit for Culture and Art
- Order of Cultural Merit (Korea)
- Order of the Direkgunabhorn (Thailand)
- Austrian Decoration for Science and Art
