= Empire of Japan =

Japanese nation state from 1868 to 1947

Coordinates: 35°40′57″N 139°45′10″E

- 1868–1947
- Flag Imperial crest
- Motto: 八紘一宇 ("Hakkō ichiu") 'Eight Crown Cords, One Roof' (1936–1947)
- Anthem: 君が代 ("Kimigayo") 'His Imperial Majesty's Reign' (1869–1945) (Note: Modified version used in 1880–1945.)
- The Empire of Japan and areas occupied or influenced by Japan during World War II: Mainland Japan; de jure: Annexes; de facto: Colonies (Korea, Taiwan, Karafuto) / South Seas Mandate (de facto colony after 1933); Puppet states / Protectorates / Occupied territories; Area of Operation Ichi-Go (1944).
- Status: Sovereign state; (1868−1945); Allied-military occupation; (1945–1952)
- Capital: Kyoto (1868–1869); Tokyo (1869–1947)
- Largest city: Tokyo
- Official languages: Japanese
- Recognized regional languages: Hokkien; Hakka; Korean
- Religion: De jure: Secular state; De facto: State Shinto (state ideology) (Note: Although the Empire of Japan officially had no state religion, Shinto played an important part for the Japanese state. Marius Jansen states: "The Meiji government had from the first incorporated, and in a sense created, Shinto, and utilized its tales of the divine origin of the ruling house as the core of its ritual addressed to ancestors 'of ages past'. As the Japanese empire grew the affirmation of a divine mission for the Japanese race was emphasized strongly. Shinto was imposed on colonial lands in Taiwan and Korea, and public funds were used to build and maintain new shrines there. Shinto priests were attached to army units as chaplains, and the cult of war dead, enshrined at the Yasukuni Jinja in Tokyo, took on greater proportions as their number grew.")
- Government: Absolute monarchy (1868–1889); Semi-constitutional monarchy (1889–1947); under an ultranationalist statist authoritarian regime (1940–1945)
- Emperor
  - 1868–1912: Meiji
  - 1912–1926: Taishō
  - 1926–1947: Shōwa
- Prime Minister
  - 1885–1888 (first): Itō Hirobumi
  - 1946–1947 (last): Shigeru Yoshida
- Legislature: None (rule by decree) (1868–1871); House of Peers (1871–1889); Imperial Diet (since 1889)
  - Upper house: House of Peers (1889–1947)
  - Lower house: House of Representatives (from 1890)
- Historical era: Meiji • Taishō • Shōwa
  - Meiji Restoration: January 3, 1868
  - Meiji Constitution: February 11, 1889
  - First Sino-Japanese War: July 25, 1894
  - Russo-Japanese War: February 8, 1904
  - World War I: August 23, 1914
  - Mukden Incident: September 18, 1931
  - Second Sino-Japanese War: July 7, 1937
  - Founding of the IRAA: October 12, 1940
  - World War II: December 7, 1941
  - Surrender of Japan: September 2, 1945
  - Reconstituted: May 3, 1947

Area
- 1938: 1,984,000 km^{2} (766,000 sq mi)
- 1942: 7,400,000 km^{2} (2,900,000 sq mi)

Population
  - 1920: 77,700,000^{a}
  - 1940: 105,200,000^{b}
- Currency: Japanese yen; Korean yen; Taiwanese yen
Preceded by	Succeeded by
Tokugawa shogunate; Republic of Ezo	Japan
- 1. 56.0 million lived in the naichi.; 2. 73.1 million lived in the naichi.

Japanese name
- Shinjitai: 大日本帝国
- Kyūjitai: 大日本帝󠄁國
- Hiragana: だいにっぽんていこく だいにほんていこく
- Katakana: ダイニッポンテイコク ダイニホンテイコク
- Literal meaning: Empire of Great Japan
Transcriptions
- Romanization: Dai-Nippon Teikoku; Dai-Nihon Teikoku

The Empire of Japan (Japanese: 大日本帝󠄁國／大日本帝国, Hepburn: Dai-Nippon Teikoku/Dai-Nihon Teikoku), also known as the Japanese Empire or Imperial Japan, was the period of Japanese history spanning 79 years, starting with the Meiji Restoration on 3 January 1868, and ending with ratification of the Constitution of Japan on 3 May 1947. From August 1910 to September 1945, it included mainland Japan, Okinawa, the Kurils, Karafuto, Korea, and Taiwan. The South Seas Mandate and concessions were de jure not internal parts of the empire but dependent territories. In the closing stages of World War II, with Japan defeated alongside the rest of the Axis powers, the formalized surrender was issued on 2 September 1945, in compliance with the Potsdam Declaration of the Allies, and the empire's territory subsequently shrunk to cover only mainland Japan. However, Okinawa was later returned to Japan in 1972.

Under the slogans of "Enrich the Country, Strengthen the Armed Forces" (Note: Japanese: 富国強兵, fukoku kyōhei) and "Promote Industry" (Note: Japanese: 殖産興業, shokusan kōgyō) which followed the Boshin War and the restoration of power to the emperor from the shogun, Japan underwent a period of large-scale industrialization and militarization, often regarded as the fastest modernization of any country to date. Economic and political turmoil in the 1920s, including the Great Depression, led to the rise of militarism, nationalism, statism and totalitarianism, during which Japan joined the Axis alliance with Nazi Germany and Fascist Italy, conquering a large part of the Asia–Pacific; during this period, the Imperial Japanese Army (IJA) and the Imperial Japanese Navy (IJN) committed numerous atrocities and war crimes, including the Nanjing Massacre. There has been some debate over defining the political system of the Empire of Japan as a dictatorship, due to the absence of a dictator, as well as calling it fascist. Other suggested terms are para-fascism, militarism, corporatism, totalitarianism, and police state.

The Imperial Japanese Armed Forces initially achieved large-scale military successes during the Second Sino-Japanese War and the Pacific War, most notably in the attack on Pearl Harbor in Hawaii on 7 December 1941. However, from 1942 onwards, and particularly after decisive Allied advances at Midway Atoll and Guadalcanal, Japan was forced to adopt a defensive stance against the United States. The American-led island-hopping campaign led to the eventual loss of many of Japan's Oceanian island possessions in the following three years. Eventually, the American military captured Iwo Jima and Okinawa Island, leaving the Japanese mainland unprotected and without a significant naval defense force. The situation became desperate for Japan as they faced a two-front war due to the Soviet invasion of Manchuria, in addition to the United States dropping two atomic bombs on Hiroshima and Nagasaki with overwhelming destructive power. Plans had been made for an Allied invasion of mainland Japan, but were shelved after Japan accepted unconditional surrender under the Potsdam Declaration on 14 August 1945.

On 15 August 1945, the Japanese Emperor announced Japanese surrender to the Allies on the radio. However, the Pacific War only officially came to an end on 2 September 1945, leading to the end of the Empire of Japan and the beginning of the Allied occupation of Japan, during which United States military commander Douglas MacArthur administered the country. In 1947, through Allied efforts, a new Japanese constitution was enacted, officially ending the Japanese Empire and forming modern Japan. During this time, the Imperial Japanese Armed Forces were dissolved. It was later replaced by the current Japan Self-Defense Forces in 1954. Reconstruction under the Allied occupation continued until 1952, when the Treaty of San Francisco as a peace treaty took effect.

In total, the Empire of Japan had three emperors: Meiji, Taishō, and Shōwa. The Imperial era came to an end partway through Shōwa's reign, and he remained emperor until his death in 1989.

== Terminology ==
The historical state is frequently referred to as the "Empire of Japan", the "Japanese Empire", or "Imperial Japan" in English. In Japanese it is referred to as Dai Nippon Teikoku (大日本帝国), which translates to "Greater Japanese Empire" (Dai "Greater", Nippon "Japanese", Teikoku "Empire"). Teikoku is itself composed of the nouns Tei "referring to an emperor" and -koku "nation, state", literally "Imperial State" or "Imperial Realm" (compare the German Kaiserreich). The name "Empire of Japan" appeared for the first time in the 1854 Convention of Kanagawa between the United States and the Tokugawa shogunate.

This meaning is significant in terms of geography, encompassing Japan, and its surrounding areas. The nomenclature Empire of Japan had existed since the anti-Tokugawa domains, Satsuma and Chōshū, which founded their new government during the Meiji Restoration, with the intention of forming a modern state to resist Western domination. Later the Empire emerged as a great power in the world.

Due to its name in kanji characters and its flag, it was given the exonyms "Empire of the Sun" and "Empire of the Rising Sun".

== History ==
=== Background ===
After two centuries, the seclusion policy, or sakoku, under the shōguns of the Edo period came to an end when the country was forced open to trade by the Convention of Kanagawa which came when American commander Matthew C. Perry arrived in Japan in 1854. Thus, the period known as Bakumatsu began.

The following years saw increased foreign trade and interaction; commercial treaties between the Tokugawa shogunate and Western countries were signed. In large part due to the humiliating terms of these unequal treaties, the shogunate soon faced internal hostility, which materialized into a radical, xenophobic movement, the sonnō jōi (literally "Revere the Emperor, expel the barbarians").

In March 1863, the Emperor issued the "order to expel barbarians." Although the shogunate had no intention of enforcing the order, it nevertheless inspired attacks against the shogunate itself and against foreigners in Japan. The Namamugi Incident during 1862 led to the murder of an Englishman, Charles Lennox Richardson, by a party of samurai from Satsuma. The British demanded reparations but were denied. While attempting to exact payment, the Royal Navy was fired on from coastal batteries near the town of Kagoshima. They responded by bombarding the port of Kagoshima in 1863. The Tokugawa government agreed to pay an indemnity for Richardson's death. Shelling of foreign shipping in Shimonoseki and attacks against foreign property led to the bombardment of Shimonoseki by a multinational force in 1864. The Chōshū clan also launched the failed coup known as the Kinmon incident. The Satsuma-Chōshū alliance was established in 1866 to combine its efforts to overthrow the Tokugawa bakufu. In early 1867, Emperor Kōmei died of smallpox, and he was replaced by his son, Crown Prince Mutsuhito (Meiji).

On November 9, 1867, Tokugawa Yoshinobu resigned from his post and authorities to the emperor, agreeing to "be the instrument for carrying out" imperial orders, leading to the end of the Tokugawa shogunate. However, while Yoshinobu's resignation had created a nominal void at the highest level of government, his apparatus of state continued to exist. Moreover, the shogunal government, the Tokugawa family in particular, remained a prominent force in the evolving political order and retained many executive powers, a prospect hard-liners from Satsuma and Chōshū found intolerable.

On January 3, 1868, Satsuma-Chōshū forces seized the imperial palace in Kyoto, and the following day had the fifteen-year-old Emperor Meiji declare his own restoration to full power. Although the majority of the imperial consultative assembly was happy with the formal declaration of direct rule by the court and tended to support a continued collaboration with the Tokugawa, Saigō Takamori, leader of the Satsuma clan, threatened the assembly into abolishing the title shōgun and ordered the confiscation of Yoshinobu's lands. (Note: During a recess, Saigō, who had his troops outside, "remarked that it would take only one short sword to settle the discussion". The word used for "dagger" was tantō.)

On January 17, 1868, Yoshinobu declared "that he would not be bound by the proclamation of the Restoration and called on the court to rescind it". On January 24, Yoshinobu decided to prepare an attack on Kyoto, occupied by Satsuma and Chōshū forces. This decision was prompted by his learning of a series of arson attacks in Edo, starting with the burning of the outworks of Edo Castle, the main Tokugawa residence.

==== Boshin War ====
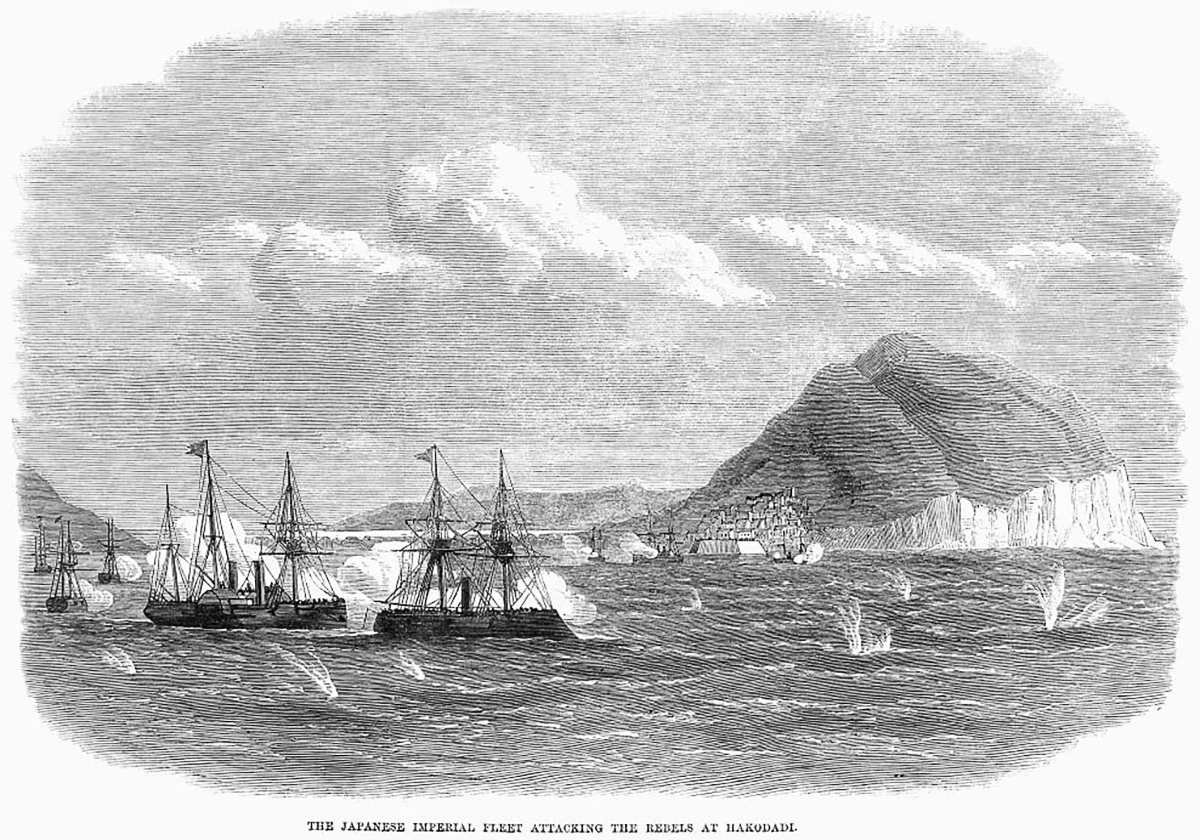
The Naval Battle of Hakodate, May 1869; in the foreground, Kasuga and Kōtetsu of the Imperial Japanese Navy

The Boshin War (戊辰戦争, Boshin Sensō) was fought between January 1868 and May 1869. The alliance of samurai from southern and western domains and court officials had now secured the cooperation of the young Emperor Meiji, who ordered the dissolution of the two-hundred-year-old Tokugawa shogunate. Tokugawa Yoshinobu launched a military campaign to seize the emperor's court in Kyoto. However, the tide rapidly turned in favor of the smaller but relatively modernized imperial faction and resulted in defections of many daimyōs to the Imperial side. The Battle of Toba–Fushimi was a decisive victory in which a combined army from Chōshū, Tosa, and Satsuma domains defeated the Tokugawa army. A series of battles were then fought in pursuit of supporters of the Shogunate; Edo surrendered to the Imperial forces and afterward, Yoshinobu personally surrendered. Yoshinobu was stripped of all his power by Emperor Meiji and most of Japan accepted the emperor's rule.

Pro-Tokugawa remnants retreated to northern Honshū (Ōuetsu Reppan Dōmei) and later to Ezo (present-day Hokkaido), where they established the breakaway Republic of Ezo. An expeditionary force was dispatched by the new government and the Ezo Republic forces were overwhelmed. The siege of Hakodate came to an end in May 1869 and the remaining forces surrendered.

=== Meiji era (1868–1912) ===
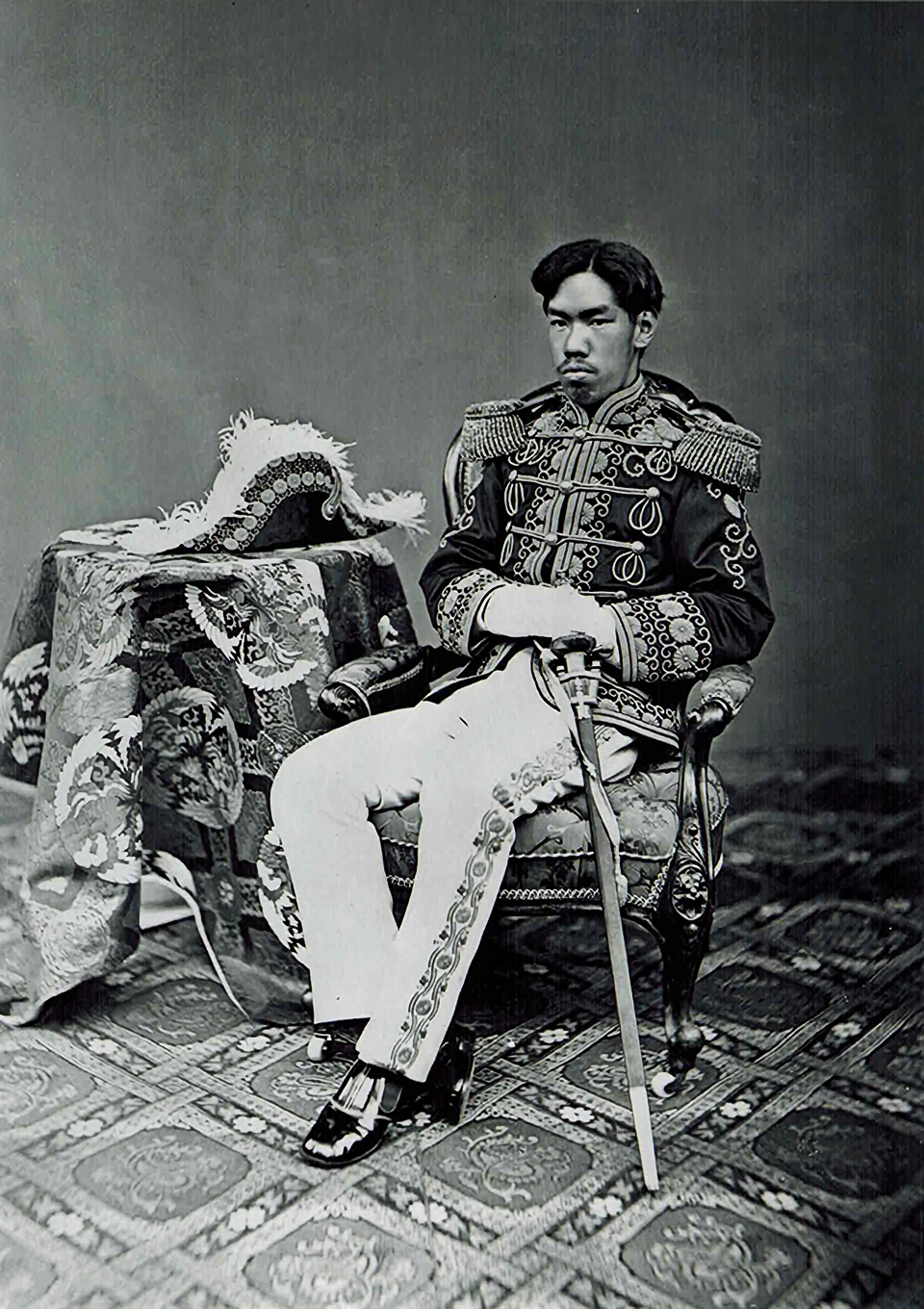
Emperor Meiji, the 122nd emperor of Japan, in a Western-style uniform (1873)

The Charter Oath was made public at the enthronement of Emperor Meiji of Japan on April 7, 1868. The Oath outlined the main aims and the course of action to be followed during Emperor Meiji's reign, setting the legal stage for Japan's modernization. The Meiji leaders also aimed to boost morale and win financial support for the new government.

Prominent members of the Iwakura mission. Left to right: Kido Takayoshi, Yamaguchi Masuka, Iwakura Tomomi, Itō Hirobumi, Ōkubo Toshimichi

Japan dispatched the Iwakura Mission in 1871. The mission traveled the world in order to renegotiate the unequal treaties with the United States and European countries that Japan had been forced into during the Tokugawa shogunate, and to gather information on western social and economic systems, in order to effect the modernization of Japan. Renegotiation of the unequal treaties was universally unsuccessful, but close observation of the American and European systems inspired members on their return to bring about modernization initiatives in Japan. Japan made a territorial delimitation treaty with Russia in 1875, gaining all the Kuril islands in exchange for Sakhalin island. The Ryukyu Domain was abolished by the Meiji government in 1879 and reorganized as Okinawa Prefecture, and the Ryukyuan monarchy was integrated into the new Japanese nobility.

The Japanese government sent observers to Western countries to observe and learn their practices and paid "foreign advisors" in a variety of fields to come to Japan to educate the populace. For instance, the judicial system and constitution were modeled after Prussia, described by Saburō Ienaga as "an attempt to control popular thought with a blend of Confucianism and German conservatism." The government also outlawed customs linked to Japan's feudal past, such as publicly displaying and wearing katana and the top knot, both of which were characteristic of the samurai class, which was abolished with the caste system. This change later brought the Meiji government into conflict with the samurai.

Several writers, under the constant threat of assassination from their political foes, were influential in winning Japanese support for westernization. One writer was Fukuzawa Yukichi, whose works included "Conditions in the West", "Leaving Asia", and "An Outline of a Theory of Civilization", which detailed Western society and his own philosophies. In these works, he praised Western civilization and sought to emulate it as a way of national survival. He believed that Qing China and Joseon Korea were resisting modernization and that Japan's association with them would only lead Western nations to view Japan as equally "backwards" and thus colonize it as they did with the Opium Wars in China, which aided the intellectual groundwork for Japan's rapid Westernization. In the Meiji Restoration period, military and economic power was emphasized. Military strength became the means for national development and stability, a policy known as fukoku kyōhei (Enrich the Country, Strengthen the Armed Forces). Imperial Japan became the only non-Western world power and a major force in East Asia in about 25 years as a result of industrialization and economic development.

As writer Albrecht Fürst von Urach comments in his booklet "The Secret of Japan's Strength", published in 1942, during the Axis powers period:

The rise of Japan to a world power during the past 80 years is the greatest miracle in world history. The mighty empires of antiquity, the major political institutions of the Middle Ages and the early modern era, the Spanish Empire, the British Empire, all needed centuries to achieve their full strength. Japan's rise has been meteoric. After only 80 years, it is one of the few great powers that determine the fate of the world.

==== Transposition in social order and cultural destruction ====
In the 1860s, Japan began to experience great social turmoil and rapid modernization. The feudal caste system in Japan formally ended in 1869 with the Meiji Restoration. In 1871, the newly formed Meiji government issued a decree titled Senmin Haishirei (賤民廃止令 Edict Abolishing Ignoble Classes) giving burakumin equal legal status. It is currently better known as the Kaihōrei (解放令 Emancipation Edict). However, the elimination of economic monopolies over certain occupations actually led to a decline in general living standards, and social discrimination simply continued. For example, the ban on the consumption of meat from livestock was lifted in 1871, and many former burakumin moved on to work in abattoirs and as butchers. However, slow-changing social attitudes, especially in the countryside, meant that abattoirs and workers were met with hostility from local residents. Continued ostracism as well as the decline in living standards led to former burakumin communities turning into slum areas.

In the blood tax riots in 1873, the Japanese Meiji government brutally put down revolts by Japanese samurai angry over the legal revocation of the traditional untouchable status of burakumin.

The social tension continued to grow during the Meiji period, affecting religious practices and institutions. Conversion from traditional faith was no longer legally forbidden, officials lifted the 250-year ban on Christianity, and missionaries of established Christian churches reentered Japan. The traditional syncreticism between Shinto and Buddhism ended. Losing the protection of the Japanese government which Buddhism had enjoyed for centuries, Buddhist monks faced radical difficulties in sustaining their institutions, but their activities became less restrained by governmental policies and restrictions. As social conflicts emerged in this last decade of the Edo period, some new religious movements appeared, which were directly influenced by shamanism and Shinto.

Emperor Ogimachi issued edicts to ban Catholicism in 1565 and 1568, but to little effect. Beginning in 1587 with imperial regent Toyotomi Hideyoshi's ban on Jesuit missionaries, Christianity was repressed as a threat to national unity. Under Hideyoshi and the succeeding Tokugawa shogunate, Catholic Christianity was repressed and adherents were persecuted. After the Tokugawa shogunate banned Christianity in 1620, it ceased to exist publicly. Many Catholics went underground, becoming hidden Christians (隠れキリシタン, kakure kirishitan), and others lost their lives. After Japan was opened to foreign powers in 1853, many Christian clergymen were sent from Catholic, Protestant, and Orthodox churches, but proselytism was still banned. Only after the Meiji Restoration, was Christianity re-established in Japan. Freedom of religion was introduced in 1871, giving all Christian communities the right to legal existence.

Eastern Orthodoxy was brought to Japan in the 19th century by St. Nicholas (baptized as Ivan Dmitrievich Kasatkin), who was sent in 1861 by the Russian Orthodox Church to Hakodate, Hokkaido as priest to a chapel of the Russian Consulate. St. Nicholas of Japan made his own translation of the New Testament and some other religious books (Lenten Triodion, Pentecostarion, Feast Services, Book of Psalms, Irmologion) into Japanese. Nicholas has since been canonized as a saint by the Patriarchate of Moscow in 1970, and is now recognized as St. Nicholas, Equal-to-the-Apostles to Japan. His commemoration day is February 16. Andronic Nikolsky, appointed the first Bishop of Kyoto and later martyred as the archbishop of Perm during the Russian Revolution, was canonized by the Russian Orthodox Church as a Saint and Martyr in the year 2000.

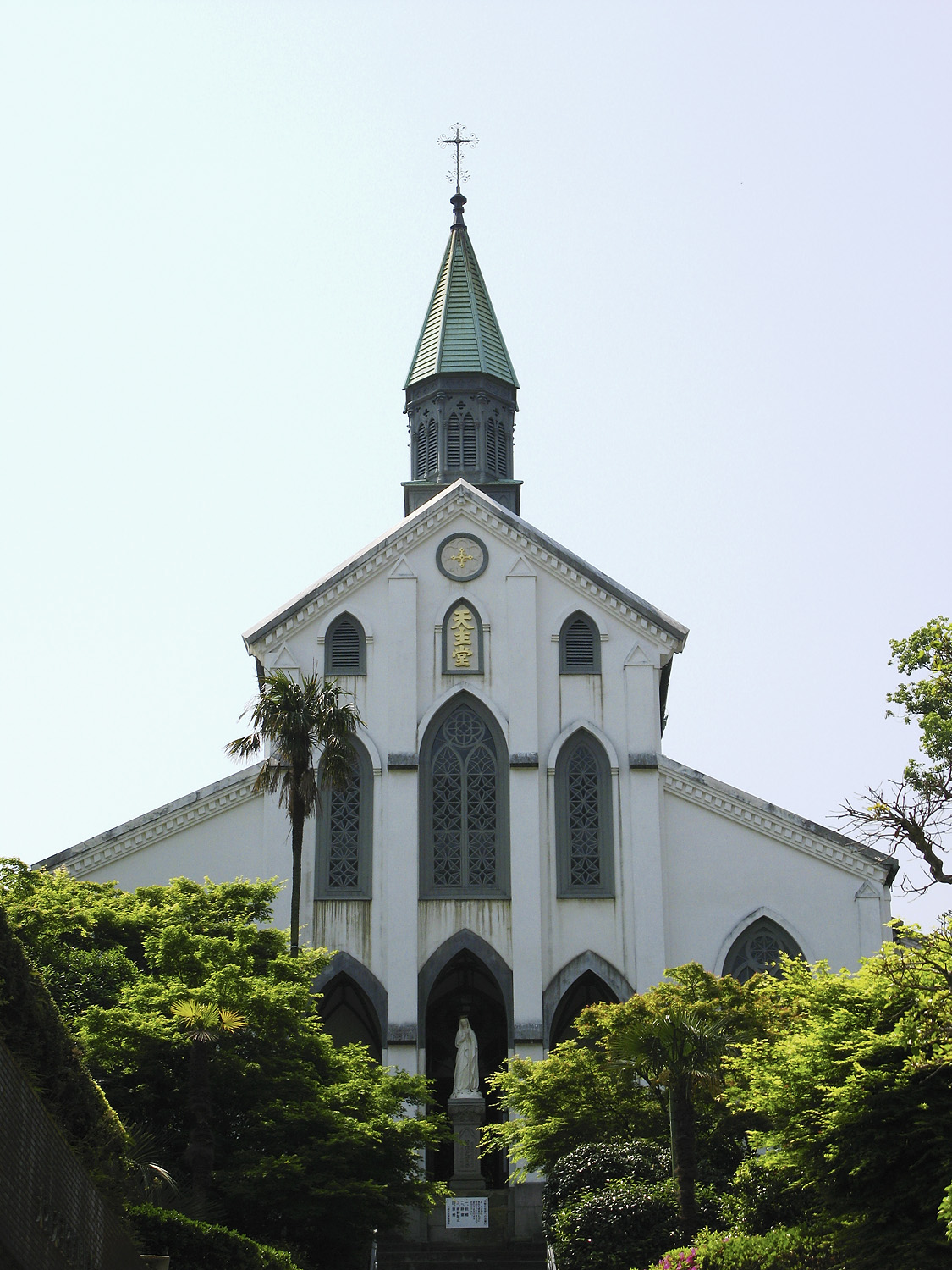
Ōura Church, Nagasaki

Divie Bethune McCartee was the first ordained Presbyterian minister missionary to visit Japan, in 1861–1862. His gospel tract translated into Japanese was among the first Protestant literature in Japan. In 1865, McCartee moved back to Ningbo, China, but others have followed in his footsteps. There was a burst of growth of Christianity in the late 19th century when Japan re-opened its doors to the West. Protestant church growth slowed dramatically in the early 20th century under the influence of the military government during the Shōwa period.

Under the Meiji Restoration, the practices of the samurai classes, deemed feudal and unsuitable for modern times following the end of sakoku in 1853, resulted in a number of edicts intended to 'modernise' the appearance of upper class Japanese men. With the Dampatsurei Edict of 1871 issued by Emperor Meiji during the early Meiji Era, men of the samurai classes were forced to cut their hair short, effectively abandoning the chonmage (chonmage) hairstyle.

During the early 20th century, the government was suspicious towards a number of unauthorized religious movements and periodically made attempts to suppress them. Government suppression was especially severe from the 1930s until the early 1940s, when the growth of Japanese nationalism and State Shinto were closely linked. Under the Meiji regime lèse majesté prohibited insults against the Emperor and his Imperial House as well as against some major Shinto shrines which were believed to be tied strongly to the Emperor. The government strengthened its control over religious institutions that were considered to undermine State Shinto or nationalism.

The majority of Japanese castles were smashed and destroyed in the late 19th century in the Meiji restoration by the Japanese people and government in order to modernize and westernize Japan and break from past feudal era of the Daimyo and Shoguns. It was only due to the 1964 Summer Olympics in Japan that cheap concrete replicas of those castles were built for tourists. The vast majority of castles in Japan today are new replicas made out of concrete. In 1959 a concrete keep was built for Nagoya castle.

During the Meiji restoration's Shinbutsu bunri, tens of thousands of Japanese Buddhist religious idols and temples were smashed and destroyed. Many statues still lie in ruins. Replica temples were rebuilt with concrete. Japan then closed and shut down tens of thousands of traditional old Shinto shrines in the Shrine Consolidation Policy, and the Meiji government built the new modern 15 shrines of the Kenmu restoration as a political move to link the Meiji restoration to the Kenmu restoration for the new State Shinto cult.

The Japanese had to look at old paintings in order to find out what the Horyuji temple used to look like when they rebuilt it. The rebuilding was originally planned for the Shōwa era. The Japanese also used mostly concrete in 1934 to rebuild the Togetsukyo Bridge, unlike the original destroyed wooden version of the bridge from 836.

==== Political reform ====
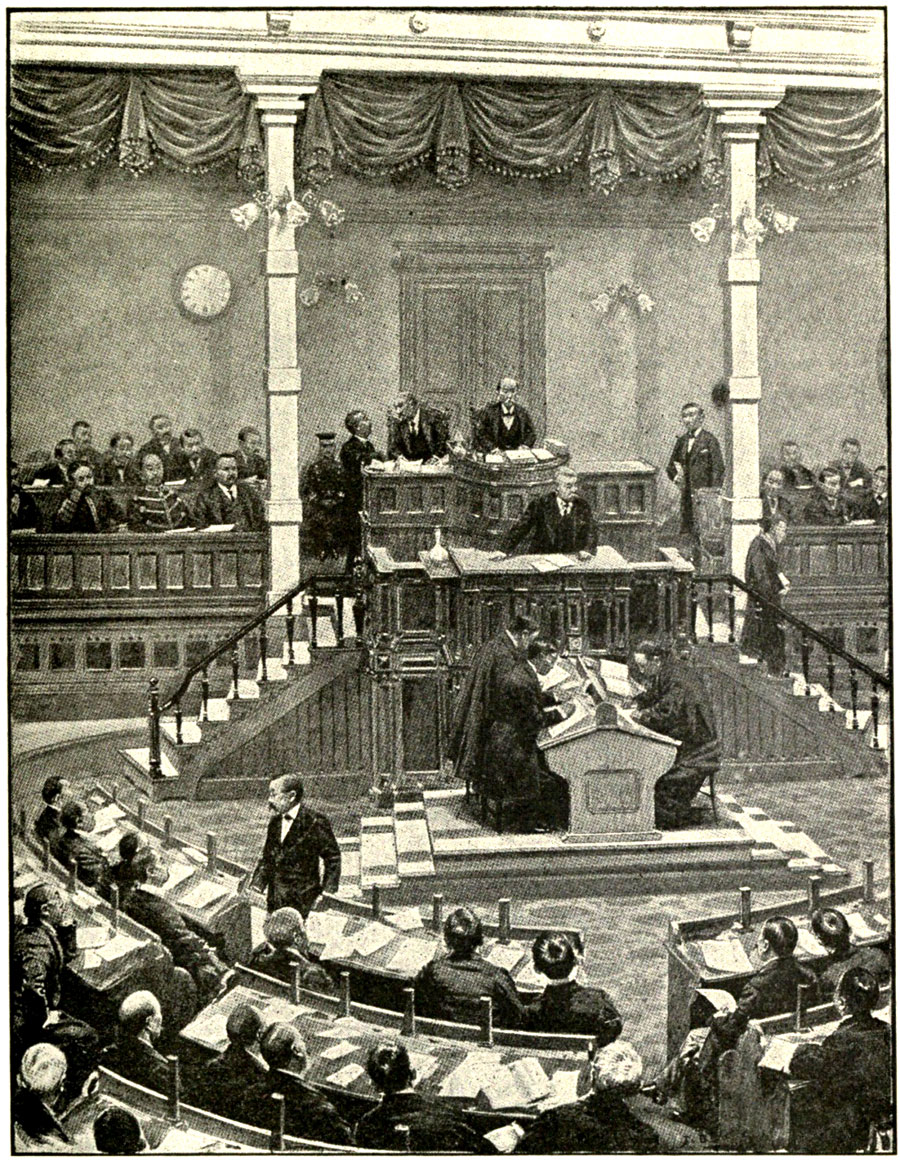
Interior of the Japanese Parliament, showing the Prime Minister speaking addressing the House of Peers, 1915

The idea of a written constitution had been a subject of heated debate within and outside of the government since the beginnings of the Meiji government. The conservative Meiji oligarchy viewed anything resembling democracy or republicanism with suspicion and trepidation, and favored a gradualist approach. The Freedom and People's Rights Movement demanded the immediate establishment of an elected national assembly, and the promulgation of a constitution.

The constitution recognized the need for change and modernization after the removal of the shogunate:

We, the Successor to the prosperous Throne of Our Predecessors, do humbly and solemnly swear to the Imperial Founder of Our House and to Our other Imperial Ancestors that, in pursuance of a great policy co-extensive with the Heavens and with the Earth, We shall maintain and secure from decline the ancient form of government. ... In consideration of the progressive tendency of the course of human affairs and in parallel with the advance of civilization, We deem it expedient, in order to give clearness and distinctness to the instructions bequeathed by the Imperial Founder of Our House and by Our other Imperial Ancestors, to establish fundamental laws....

Imperial Japan was founded, de jure, after the 1889 signing of Constitution of the Empire of Japan. The constitution formalized much of the Empire's political structure and gave many responsibilities and powers to the Emperor.

- Article 1. The Empire of Japan shall be reigned over and governed by a line of Emperors unbroken for ages eternal.
- Article 2. The Imperial Throne shall be succeeded to by Imperial male descendants, according to the provisions of the Imperial House Law.
- Article 3. The Emperor is sacred and inviolable.
- Article 4. The Emperor is the head of the Empire, combining in Himself the rights of sovereignty, and exercises them, according to the provisions of the present Constitution.
- Article 5. The Emperor exercises the legislative power with the consent of the Imperial Diet.
- Article 6. The Emperor gives sanction to laws, and orders them to be promulgated and executed.
- Article 7. The Emperor convokes the Imperial Diet, opens, closes and prorogues it, and dissolves the House of Representatives.
- Article 11. The Emperor has the supreme command of the Army and Navy.
- Article 12. The Emperor determines the organization and peace standing of the Army and Navy.
- Article 13. The Emperor declares war, makes peace, and concludes treaties.
- Article 14. The Emperor declares a state of siege.
- Article 15. The Emperor confers titles of nobility, rank, orders and other marks of honor.
- Article 16. The Emperor orders amnesty, pardon, commutation of punishments and rehabilitation.
- Article 17. A Regency shall be instituted in conformity with the provisions of the Imperial House Law.

In 1890, the Imperial Diet was established in response to the Meiji Constitution. The Diet consisted of the House of Representatives of Japan and the House of Peers. Both houses opened seats for colonial people as well as Japanese. The Imperial Diet continued until 1947.

==== Economic development ====
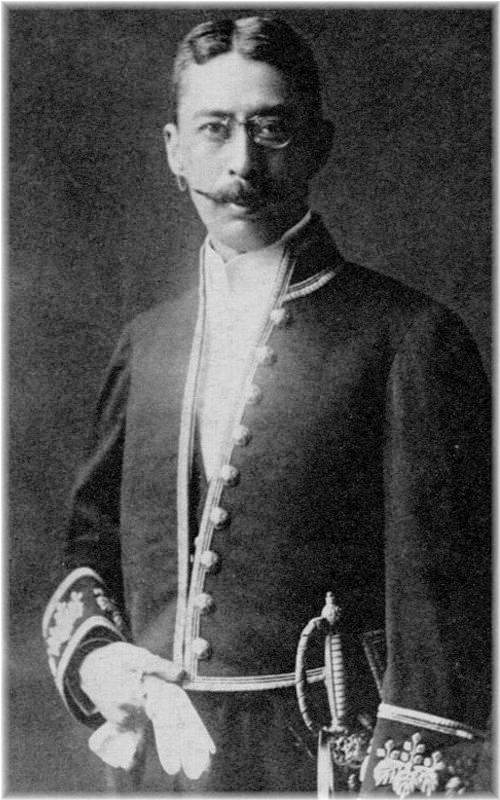
Baron Masuda Tarokaja, a member of the House of Peers (Kazoku). His father, Baron Masuda Takashi, was responsible for transforming Mitsui into a zaibatsu.

Economic development was characterized by rapid industrialization, the development of a capitalist economy, and the transformation of many feudal workers to wage labor. The use of strike action also increased, and 1897, with the establishment of a union for metalworkers, the foundations of the modern Japanese trade-union movement were formed.

Samurai were allowed to work in any occupation they wanted. Admission to universities was determined based on examination results. The government also recruited more than 3,000 Westerners to teach modern science, mathematics, technology, and foreign languages in Japan (O-yatoi gaikokujin). Despite this, social mobility was still low due to samurai and their descendants being overrepresented in the new elite class.

After sending observers to the United States, the Empire of Japan initially copied the decentralized American system with no central bank. In 1871, the New Currency Act of Meiji 4 (1871) abolished the local currencies and established the yen as the new decimal currency. It had parity with the Mexican silver dollar.

==== First Sino-Japanese War and the cession of Taiwan to Japan ====
The First Sino-Japanese War, fought in 1894 and 1895, revolved around the issue of control and influence over Korea under the rule of the Joseon dynasty. Korea had traditionally been a tributary state of China's Qing Empire, which exerted large influence over the conservative Korean officials who gathered around the royal family of the Joseon kingdom. On February 27, 1876, after several confrontations between Korean isolationists and the Japanese, Japan imposed the Japan–Korea Treaty of 1876, forcing Korea open to Japanese trade. The act blocked any other power from dominating Korea, resolving to end the centuries-old Chinese suzerainty. In 1884, pro-Japanese reformers in Korea attempted to overthrow the conservative Korean government and China intervened to suppress the rebellion, leading to a clash whereby several Japanese guards were killed. In 1885, both China and Japan signed a treaty that agreed to withdraw their troops from Korea and stipulated that neither country would send forces there without notifying the other in advance.

On June 4, 1894, Korea requested aid from the Qing Empire in suppressing the Donghak Rebellion. The Qing government sent 2,800 troops to Korea and the Japanese countered by sending an 8,000-troop expeditionary force (the Oshima Composite Brigade) to Korea, arguing that China had breached the treaty. The first 400 troops arrived on June 9 en route to Seoul, and 3,000 landed at Incheon on June 12. The Qing government turned down Japan's suggestion for Japan and China to cooperate to reform the Korean government. When Korea demanded that Japan withdraw its troops from Korea, the Japanese refused. In early June 1894, the 8,000 Japanese troops captured the Korean king Gojong, occupied the Royal Palace in Seoul and, by June 25, installed a puppet government in Seoul. The new pro-Japanese Korean government granted Japan the right to expel Qing forces while Japan dispatched more troops to Korea.

China objected and war ensued. Japanese ground troops routed the Chinese forces on the Liaodong Peninsula, and nearly destroyed the Chinese navy in the Battle of the Yalu River. The Treaty of Shimonoseki was signed between Japan and China, which ceded the Liaodong Peninsula and the island of Taiwan to Japan. After the peace treaty, Russia, Germany, and France forced Japan to withdraw from Liaodong Peninsula in the Triple Intervention. Soon afterward, Russia occupied the Liaodong Peninsula, built the Port Arthur fortress, and based the Russian Pacific Fleet in the port. Germany occupied Jiaozhou Bay, built Tsingtao fortress and based the German East Asia Squadron in this port.

==== Boxer Rebellion ====
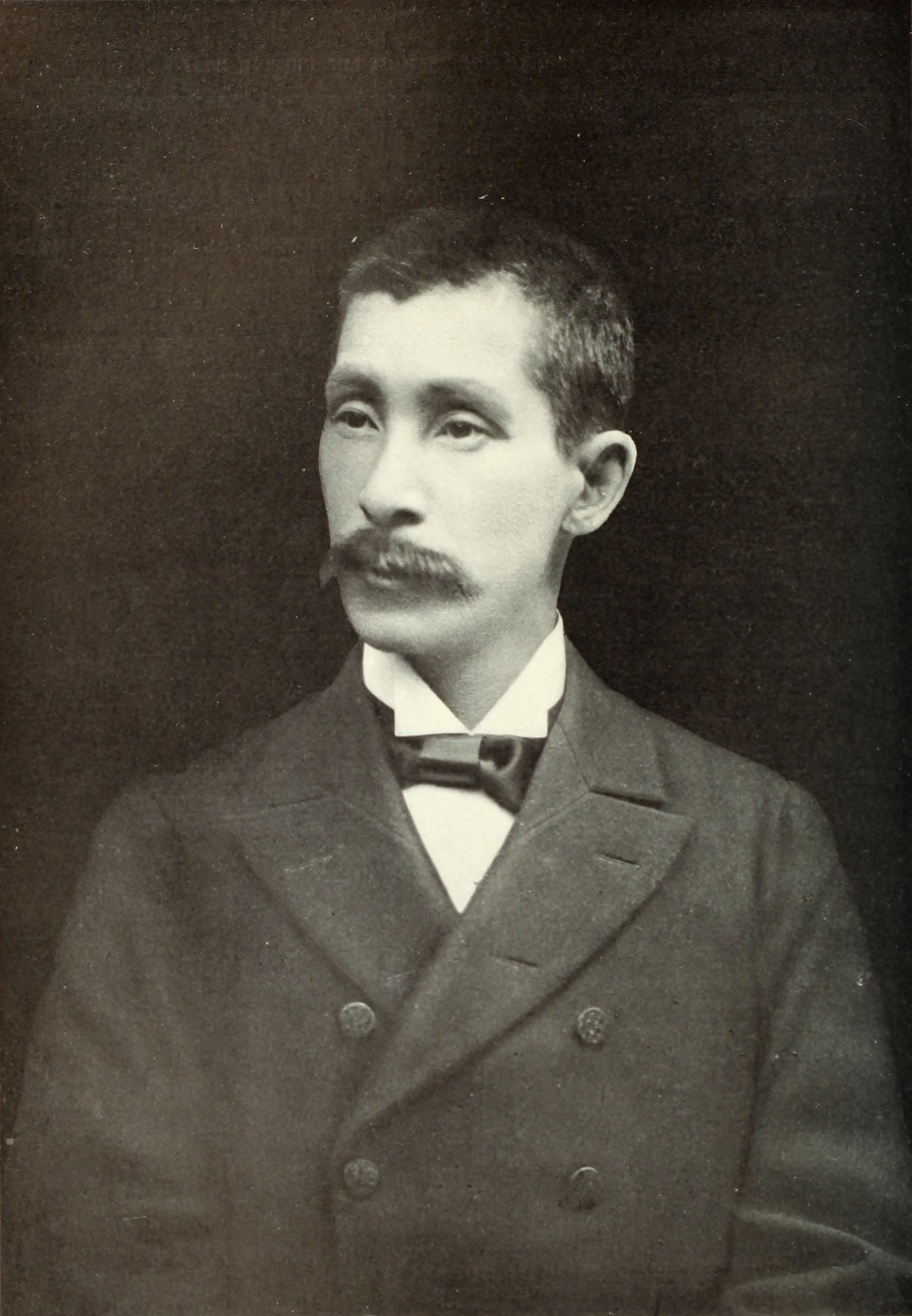
Marquess Komura Jutaro. Komura became Minister for Foreign Affairs under the first Katsura administration, and signed the Boxer Protocol on behalf of Japan.

In 1900, Japan joined an international military coalition set up in response to the Boxer Rebellion in the Qing Empire of China. Japan provided the largest contingent of troops: 20,840, as well as 18 warships. Of the total, 20,300 were Imperial Japanese Army troops of the 5th Infantry Division under Lt. General Yamaguchi Motoomi; the remainder were 540 naval rikusentai (marines) from the Imperial Japanese Navy.

At the beginning of the Boxer Rebellion the Japanese only had 215 troops in northern China stationed at Tientsin; nearly all of them were naval rikusentai from the Kasagi and the Atago, under the command of Captain Shimamura Hayao. The Japanese were able to contribute 52 men to the Seymour Expedition. On June 12, 1900, the advance of the Seymour Expedition was halted some 50 kilometers (30 mi) from the capital, by mixed Boxer and Chinese regular army forces. The vastly outnumbered allies withdrew to the vicinity of Tianjin, having suffered more than 300 casualties. The army general staff in Tokyo had become aware of the worsening conditions in China and had drafted ambitious contingency plans, but in the wake of the Triple Intervention five years before, the government refused to deploy large numbers of troops unless requested by the western powers. However three days later, a provisional force of 1,300 troops commanded by Major General Fukushima Yasumasa was to be deployed to northern China. Fukushima was chosen because he spoke fluent English which enabled him to communicate with the British commander. The force landed near Tianjin on July 5.

On June 17, 1900, naval Rikusentai from the Kasagi and Atago had joined British, Russian, and German sailors to seize the Dagu forts near Tianjin. In light of the precarious situation, the British were compelled to ask Japan for additional reinforcements, as the Japanese had the only readily available forces in the region. Britain at the time was heavily engaged in the Boer War, so a large part of the British army was tied down in South Africa. Deploying large numbers of troops from its garrisons in India would take too much time and weaken internal security there. Overriding personal doubts, Foreign Minister Aoki Shūzō calculated that the advantages of participating in an allied coalition were too attractive to ignore. Prime Minister Yamagata agreed, but others in the cabinet demanded that there be guarantees from the British in return for the risks and costs of the major deployment of Japanese troops. On July 6, 1900, the 5th Infantry Division was alerted for possible deployment to China, but no timetable was set for this. Two days later, with more ground troops urgently needed to lift the siege of the foreign legations at Peking, the British ambassador offered the Japanese government one million British pounds in exchange for Japanese participation.

Shortly afterward, advance units of the 5th Division departed for China, bringing Japanese strength to 3,800 personnel out of the 17,000 of allied forces. The commander of the 5th Division, Lt. General Yamaguchi Motoomi, had taken operational control from Fukushima. Japanese troops were involved in the storming of Tianjin on July 14, after which the allies consolidated and awaited the remainder of the 5th Division and other coalition reinforcements. By the time the siege of legations was lifted on August 14, 1900, the Japanese force of 13,000 was the largest single contingent and made up about 40% of the approximately 33,000 strong allied expeditionary force. Japanese troops involved in the fighting had acquitted themselves well, but a British military observer felt their aggressiveness, densely packed formations, and over-willingness to attack cost them excessive and disproportionate casualties. For example, during the Tianjin fighting, the Japanese suffered more than half of the allied casualties (400 out of 730) but comprised less than one quarter (3,800) of the force of 17,000. Similarly at Beijing, the Japanese accounted for almost two-thirds of the losses (280 of 453) but they constituted slightly less than half of the assault force.

After the uprising, Japan and the Western countries signed the Boxer Protocol with China, which permitted them to station troops on Chinese soil to protect their citizens. After the treaty, Russia continued to occupy all of Manchuria.

==== Russo-Japanese War ====
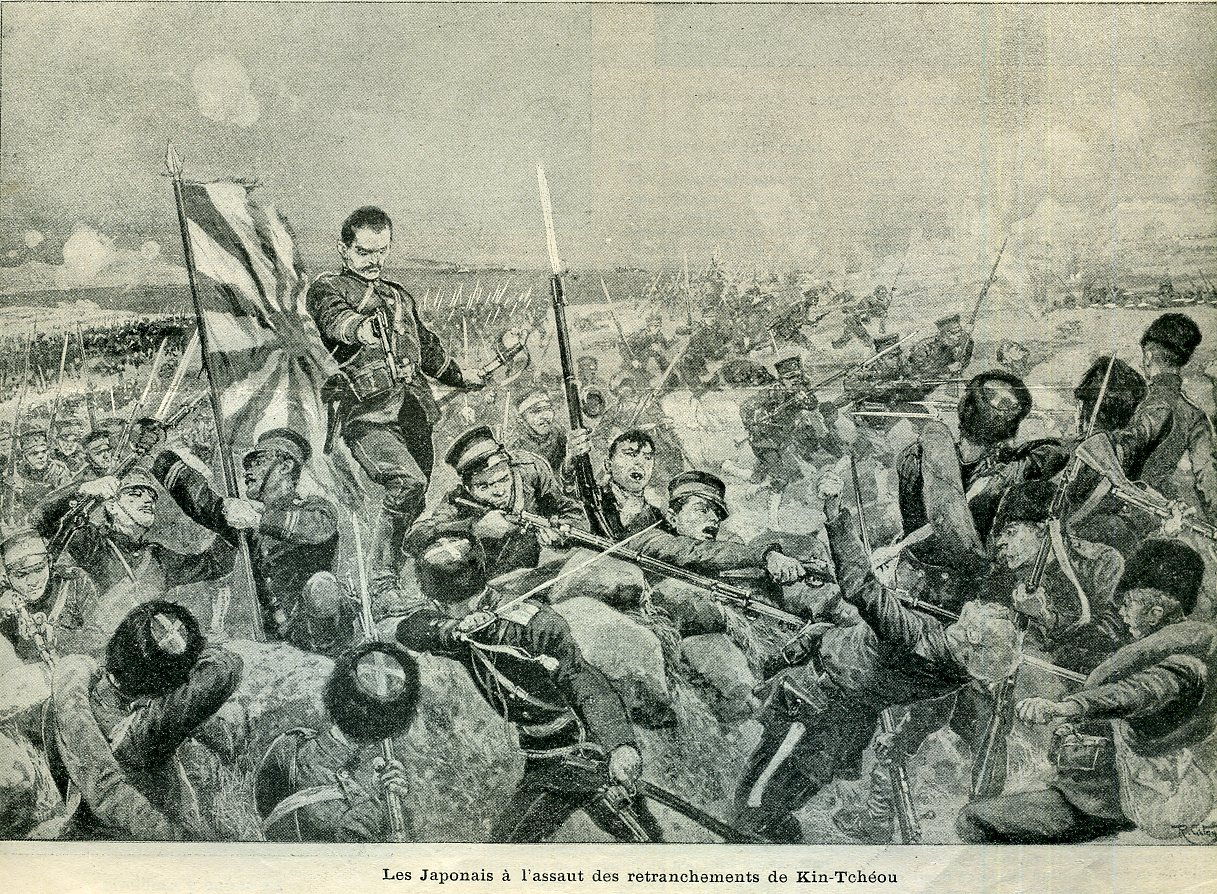
French illustration of a Japanese assault on entrenched Russian troops during the Russo-Japanese War

The Russo-Japanese War was a conflict for control of Korea and parts of Manchuria between the Russian Empire and Empire of Japan that took place from 1904 to 1905. The victory greatly raised Japan's stature in the world of global politics. The war is marked by the Japanese opposition of Russian interests in Korea, Manchuria, and China, notably, the Liaodong Peninsula, controlled by the city of Ryojun.

Originally, in the Treaty of Shimonoseki, Ryojun had been given to Japan. This part of the treaty was overruled by Western powers, which gave the port to the Russian Empire, advancing Russian interests in the region. These interests came into conflict with Japanese interests. The war began with a surprise attack on the Russian Eastern fleet stationed at Port Arthur, which was followed by the Battle of Port Arthur. Those elements that attempted escape were defeated by the Japanese navy under Admiral Togo Heihachiro at the Battle of the Yellow Sea. Following a late start, the Russian Baltic fleet was denied passage through the British-controlled Suez Canal. The fleet arrived on the scene a year later, only to be annihilated in the Battle of Tsushima.

While the ground war did not fare as poorly for the Russians, the Japanese forces were significantly more aggressive than their Russian counterparts and gained a political advantage that culminated with the Treaty of Portsmouth, negotiated in the United States by the American president Theodore Roosevelt. As a result, Russia lost the part of Sakhalin Island south of 50 degrees North latitude (which became Karafuto Prefecture), as well as many mineral rights in Manchuria. In addition, Russia's defeat cleared the way for Japan to annex Korea outright in 1910.

==== Annexation of Korea ====
In the late 19th and early 20th centuries, various Western countries actively competed for influence, trade, and territory in East Asia, and Japan sought to join these modern colonial powers. The newly modernized Meiji government of Japan turned to Korea (under the Joseon dynasty), then in the sphere of influence of China's Qing dynasty. The Japanese government initially sought to separate Korea from Qing and make Korea a Japanese puppet state in order to advance its security and national interests.

In January 1876, following the Meiji Restoration, Japan employed gunboat diplomacy to pressure the Joseon Dynasty into signing the Japan–Korea Treaty of 1876, which granted extraterritorial rights to Japanese citizens and opened three Korean ports to Japanese trade. The rights granted to Japan under this unequal treaty, were similar to those granted western powers in Japan following the visit of Commodore Perry. Japanese involvement in Korea increased during the 1890s, a period of political upheaval.

The Korean Empire was then occupied and declared a Japanese protectorate following the Japan–Korea Treaty of 1905. Japan formally annexed Korea in August 1910 and ended its occupation 35 years later with the surrender of Japan in World War II on September 2, 1945. In Korea, the period is usually described as the "Time of Japanese Forced Occupation" (Hangul: 일제 강점기; Ilje gangjeomgi, Hanja: 日帝强占期). Other terms include "Japanese Imperial Period" (Hangul: 일제시대, Ilje sidae, Hanja: 日帝時代) or "Japanese administration" (Hangul: 왜정, Wae jeong, Hanja: 倭政). In Japan, a more common description is "The Korea of Japanese rule" (日本統治時代の朝鮮, Nippon Tōchi-jidai no Chōsen). The 1905 and 1910 treaties were eventually declared "null and void" by both Japan and South Korea in 1965.

=== Taishō era (1912–1926) ===
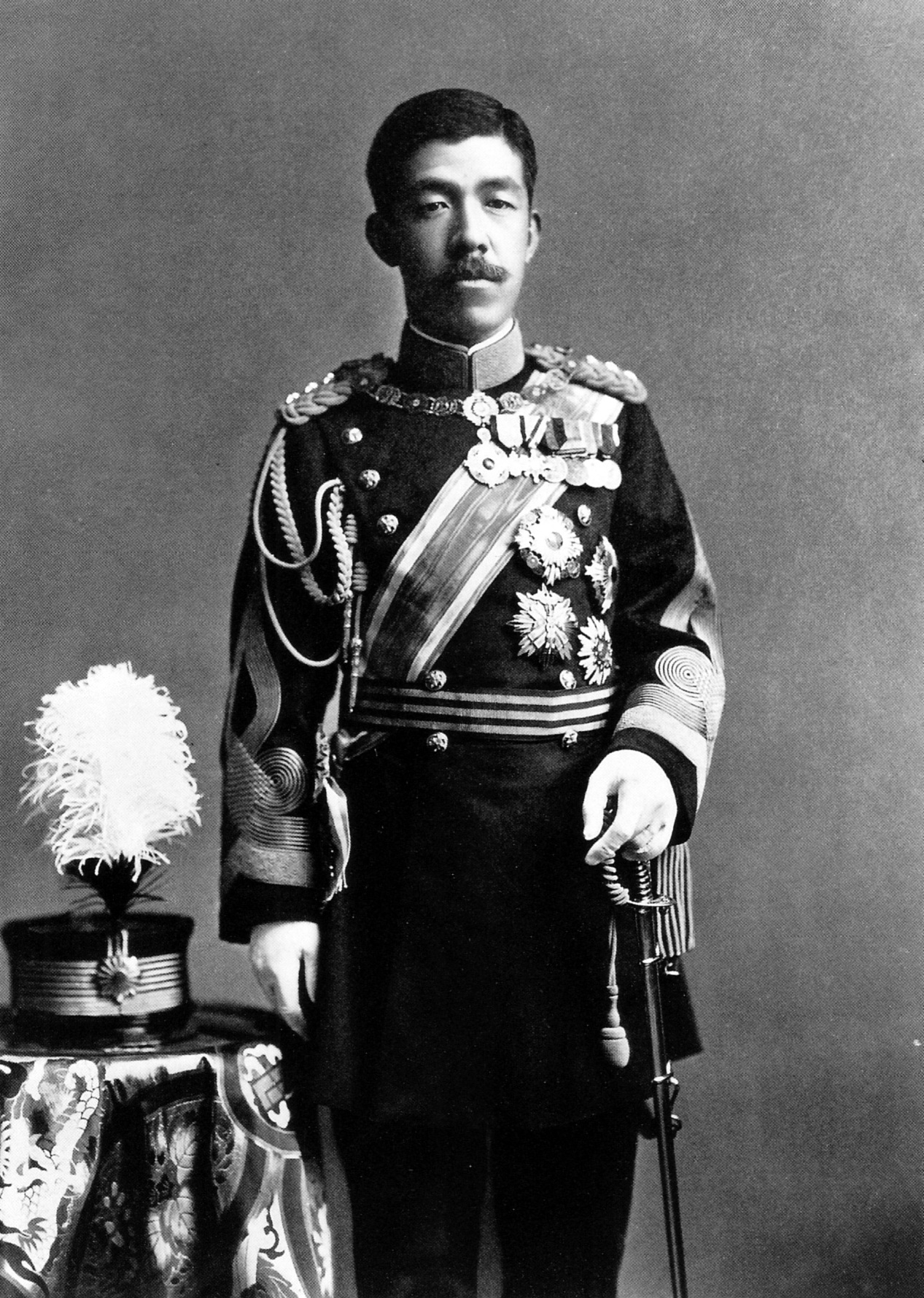
Emperor Taishō, the 123rd emperor of Japan

==== World War I ====
Japan entered World War I on the side of the Allies in 1914, capitalizing on the opportunity of Germany's distraction with the European War to expand its sphere of influence in China and the Pacific. Japan declared war on Germany on August 23, 1914. Japanese and allied British Empire forces soon moved to occupy Tsingtao fortress, the German East Asia Squadron base, German-leased territories in China's Shandong Province as well as the Marianas, Caroline, and Marshall Islands in the Pacific, which were part of German New Guinea. The swift invasion in the German territory of the Kiautschou Bay concession and the Siege of Tsingtao proved successful. The German colonial troops surrendered on November 7, 1914, and Japan gained the German holdings. In 1920, the League of Nations established the South Seas Mandate under Japanese administration to replace German New Guinea.

Capitalizing on its military successes, Japan presented Chinese President Yuan Shikai with a series of requests that would have turned China into a de facto Japanese protectorate. Known as the Twenty-One Demands, the Japanese requests included five groups of secret demands, including recognizing Japan's dominant position in Shandong, southern Manchuria and eastern Inner Mongolia, building an industrial complex in central China, forbidding China from giving any coastal or island concessions to foreign powers except Japan and the most outrageous of all, requiring China to install Japanese advisors who could take effective control of Chinese government, economy and military, an act that was seen as de facto annexation of China. The last demand was later dropped following the opposition of elder Japanese statesmen such as Matsukata Masayoshi. Yuan, who had no intention of risking war with Japan, ultimately accepted the ultimatum on 9 May 1915. Yuan's credibility and popularity as a leader weakened as a result of his appeasement policy, with the Chinese public and intellectuals denouncing the treaty as a "terrible shame" and made May 9 a day of national humiliation for China. The Twenty-One Demands nurtured a considerable amount of Chinese ill-will towards Japan, and the upsurge in Chinese nationalism eventually culminated in the May Fourth Movement in 1919 which still resonated to the present day.

With its Western allies, notably the United Kingdom, heavily involved in the war in Europe, Japan dispatched a Naval fleet to the Mediterranean Sea to aid Allied shipping. The Anglo-Japanese Alliance was renewed and expanded in scope twice, in 1905 and 1911, before its demise in 1921. It was officially terminated in 1923.

At the Paris Peace Conferences, Japan participated as one of the "Big Five" victorious Allied powers, solidifying its status as a major global power. Japan successfully secured German territorial rights in Shandong, China, and mandates over Pacific islands. It joined the League of Nations in 1920 as a charter member and one of the four permanent members of the League Council. However, its proposal for a "racial equality clause" in the League of Nations Covenant was rejected by Western colonial powers, leading to increased resentment in Japan and a growing belief that international respect could only be secured through military strength.

==== Siberian Intervention ====
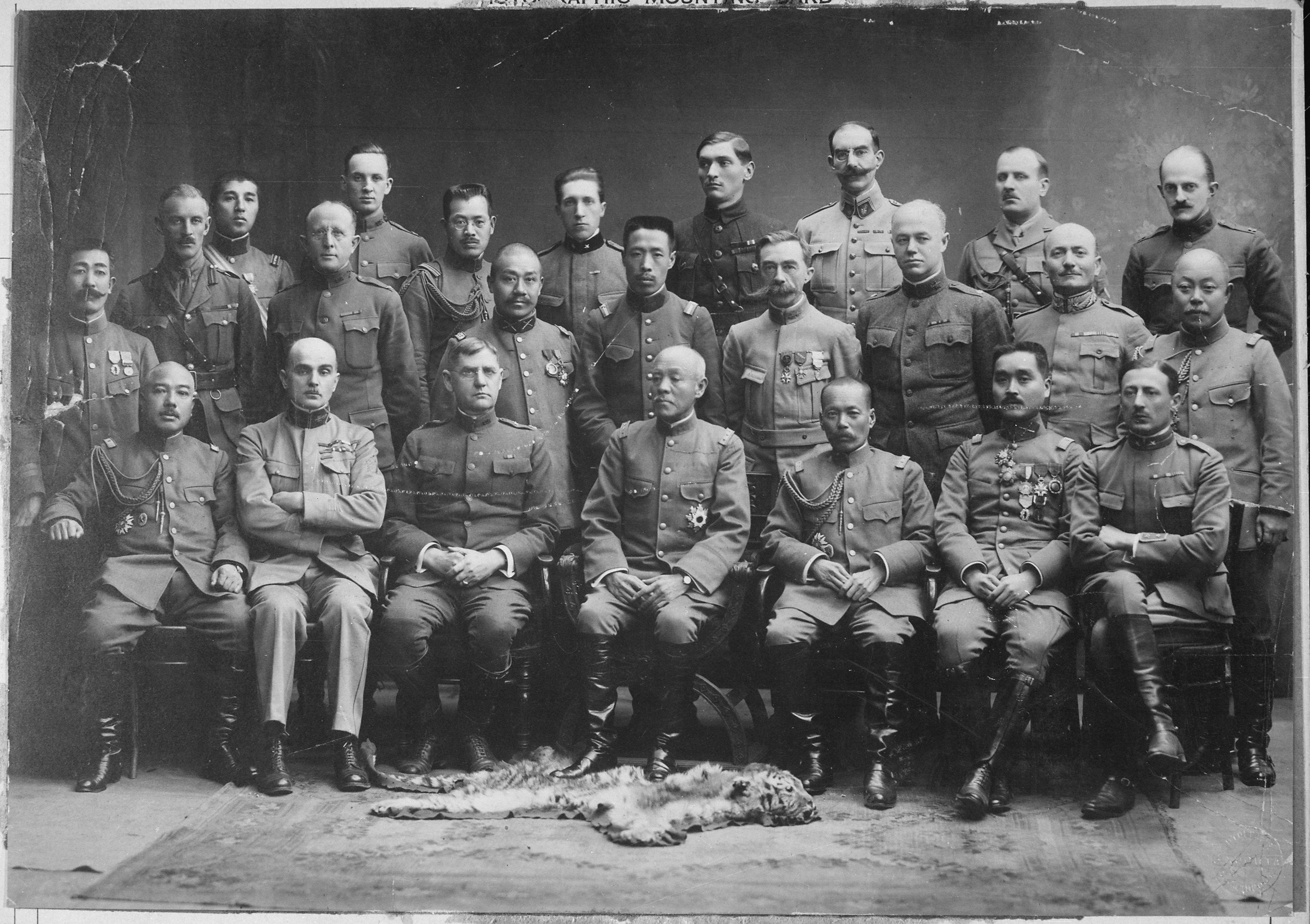
Commanding Officers and Chiefs of Staff of the Allied Military Mission to Siberia, Vladivostok during the Allied intervention

After the fall of the Tsarist regime and the later provisional regime in 1917, the new Bolshevik government signed a separate peace treaty with Germany. After this, various factions that succeeded the Russian Empire fought among themselves in a multi-sided civil war.

In July 1918, President Wilson asked the Japanese government to supply 7,000 troops as part of an international coalition of 25,000 troops planned to support the American Expeditionary Force Siberia. Prime Minister Terauchi Masatake agreed to send 12,000 troops but under the Japanese command rather than as part of an international coalition. The Japanese had several hidden motives for the venture, which included an intense hostility and fear of communism; a determination to recoup historical losses to Russia; and the desire to settle the "northern problem" in Japan's security, either through the creation of a buffer state or through outright territorial acquisition.

By November 1918, more than 70,000 Japanese troops under Chief of Staff Yui Mitsue had occupied all ports and major towns in the Russian Maritime Provinces and eastern Siberia. Japan received 765 Polish orphans from Siberia.

In June 1920, around 450 Japanese civilians and 350 Japanese soldiers, along with Russian White Army supporters, were massacred by partisan forces associated with the Red Army at Nikolayevsk on the Amur River; the United States and its allied coalition partners consequently withdrew from Vladivostok after the capture and execution of White Army leader Admiral Aleksandr Kolchak by the Red Army. However, the Japanese decided to stay, primarily due to fears of the spread of Communism so close to Japan and Japanese-controlled Korea and Manchuria. The Japanese army provided military support to the Japanese-backed Provisional Priamurye Government based in Vladivostok against the Moscow-backed Far Eastern Republic.

The continued Japanese presence concerned the United States, which suspected that Japan had territorial designs on Siberia and the Russian Far East. Subjected to intense diplomatic pressure by the United States and United Kingdom, and facing increasing domestic opposition due to the economic and human cost, the administration of Prime Minister Katō Tomosaburō withdrew the Japanese forces in October 1922. Japanese casualties from the expedition were 5,000 dead from combat or illness, with the expedition costing over 900 million yen. The Japanese occupation of northern Sakhalin would continue until 1925, when the Japanese Empire recognized the USSR.

==== Rise of militarism and its social organizations in the 1920s ====
Important institutional links existed between the party in government (Kōdōha) and military and political organizations, such as the Imperial Young Federation and the "Political Department" of the Kempeitai (the military police). Among the himitsu kessha (secret societies), the Kokuryu-kai and Kokka Shakai Shugi Gakumei (National Socialist League) also had close ties to the government. The Tonarigumi (residents committee) groups, the Nation Service Society (national government trade union), and Imperial Farmers Association were all allied with the government as well. Other organizations and groups related with the government in wartime were the Double Leaf Society, Kokuhonsha, Taisei Yokusankai, Imperial Youth Corps, Keishichō (to 1945), Shintoist Rites Research Council, Treaty Faction, Fleet Faction, and Volunteer Fighting Corps.

With old feudal connections still strong, and victories in the numerous military campaigns in Asia and against Russia, the military gained prestige and solidified the belief that "strong army" policies were necessary for Japan to gain respect as a world power. As the party politicians were perceived to have been corrupted by Western democracy and big business interests, the military portrayed themselves as incorruptible true patriots defending Japanese honor against Western influence and "weak" diplomacy.

Japanese militarists were furious at the outcome of the Washington Naval Conferences of 1921–1922, viewing them as deliberate attempts by Western powers to limit its geopolitical rise, undermined its security and denied its status as an equal global power. Initially, the moderate pro-democracy forces in Japan accepted the need for naval arms reductions on the grounds that an arms race would place a heavy burden on the Japanese economy. The head of the Japanese delegation to the Conference, Naval Minister Katō Tomosaburō, who belonged to the Treaty Faction of the Navy recognized that mutual arms reductions could work in Japan's favor. In exchange for accepting limits on its own naval power, the U.S. would have to reduce the size of its fleet, making it less of a threat to Japanese interests in the Pacific. The resulting naval ratio, which restricted Japan to a smaller fleet than the U.S. and Great Britain was later viewed as a national humiliation by the more militarist Fleet Faction of the Navy, especially after the Great Depression, as Japan was heavily dependent on imports to keep its economy afloat. The militarists would later successfully oppose new disarmament efforts during the 1930 London Naval Treaty.

The passage of the Immigration Act of 1924 (also known as the Johnson-Reed Act) in the United States caused significant anger and outrage in Japan. The act specifically banned immigration from Asia, particularly targeting Japanese immigrants. Before 1924, immigration was controlled by the 1907 Gentlemen's Agreement, which allowed Japan leeways by voluntarily restricting emigration to the U.S. The 1924 act disregarded the 1907 deal and implemented a strict legal ban.

==== "Taishō Democracy" ====
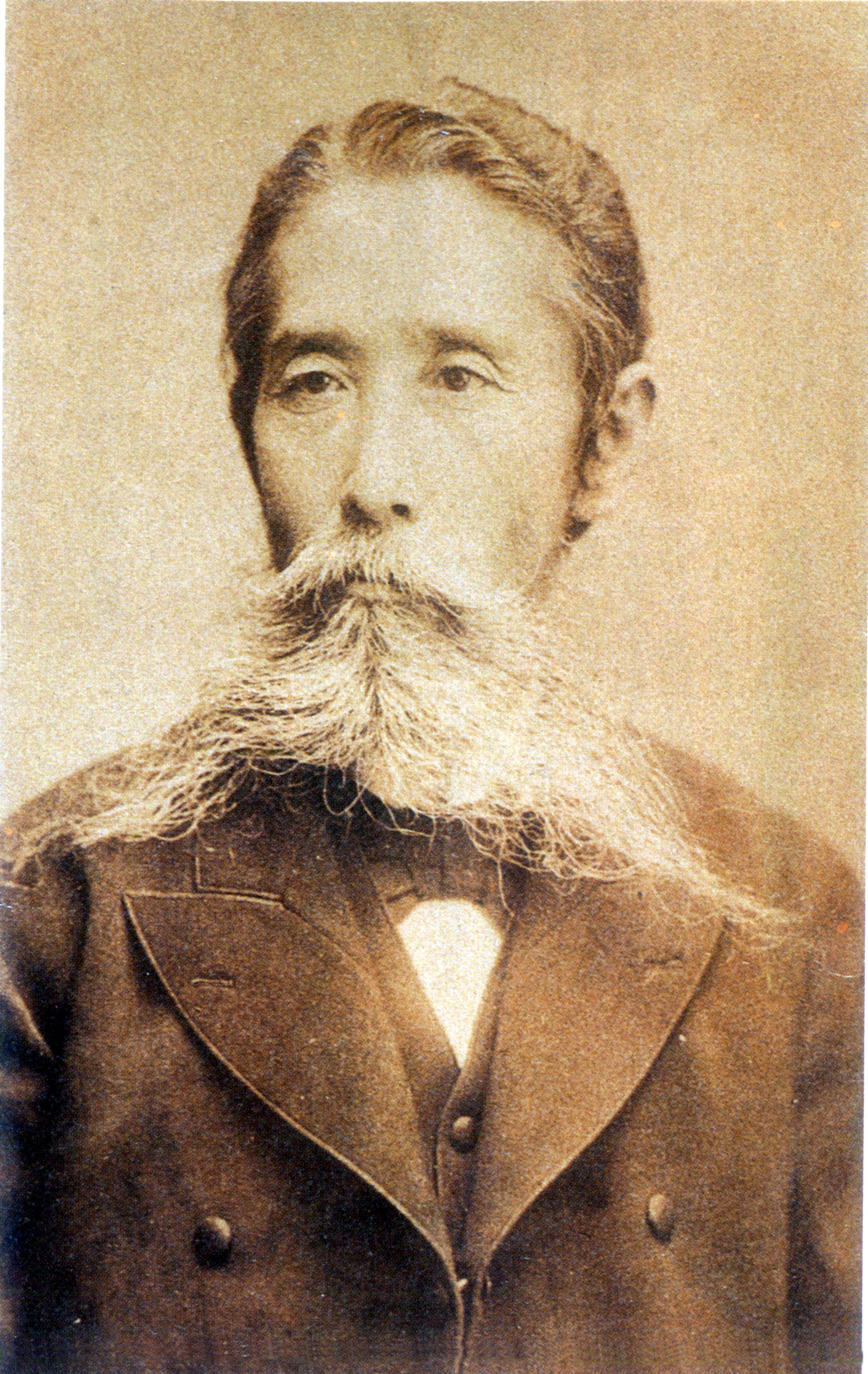
Count Itagaki Taisuke is credited as being the first Japanese party leader and an important force for liberalism in Meiji Japan.

The two-party political system that had been developing in Japan since the turn of the century came of age after World War I, giving rise to the nickname for the period, "Taishō Democracy". However, it was plagued by problems from the beginning. Due to the ambiguity of the Meiji Constitution, the military was not responsible to the civilian Diet or to the Prime Minister, but rather directly to the Emperor, allowing them to act independently. Active-duty officers had to head the army and navy ministries, which enabled the military to topple cabinet governments by refusing to appoint ministers or withdrawing them. This structural weakness eventually led to the Taishō political crisis of 1912–13, when the military, led by the genrō (elder statesmen), forced the resignation of three consecutive Prime Ministers over budget disputes. This provoked widespread public outcry and the first "Protect Constitutional Government" movement (Goken Undō) that demanded an end to Meiji oligarchic rule and the establishment of party cabinet government.

As democracy flourished, so did corruption, with party governments beginning to be heavily influenced by large business conglomerates known as zaibatsu, and becoming detached from the struggling rural populations that relied on agrarian or agricultural livelihoods. Post-war inflation and soaring food prices led to nationwide riots in 1918, weakening confidence in the civilian leadership and highlighting extreme income inequality. The public grew disillusioned with the growing national debt and the new election laws, which retained the old minimum tax qualifications for voters. Calls were raised for universal suffrage and the dismantling of the old political party network. Students, university professors, and journalists, bolstered by labor unions and inspired by a variety of democratic, socialist, communist, anarchist, and other thoughts, mounted large but orderly public demonstrations in favor of universal male suffrage in 1919 and 1920.

After Prime Minister Terauchi Masatake fell from office as a result of the riots of 1918, Hara Takashi was appointed as the first Prime Minister from a commoner background. However, criticism soon emerged that accused Hara of prioritizing the narrow interests of his conservative party, the Seiyūkai, and him catering to the zaibatsu and old elites rather than the general public. Hara also refused to grant universal male suffrage, which angered those pushing for broader democratic rights. The crucial point came with his handling of the Nikolayevsk incident during the Siberian Intervention and his efforts at reducing military power, which drew fierce criticism from right-wing nationalists and militarists. On November 4, 1921, Takashi was assassinated at the Tokyo train station by a right-wing nationalist.

On September 1, 1923, at a magnitude of 7.9, an earthquake struck Kantō Plain. The death toll was estimated to have exceeded to 140,000 lives lost. On the same day, the Imperial Japanese Army and its nationalists began committing a massacre of Korean residents after scapegoating them for the disaster. The disaster also prompted the government to declare martial law, ushering in the largest domestic deployment of the army in Japanese history. This established a lasting "emergency" (hijōji) mentality, where the state prioritized control over democratic freedoms. Elites and conservatives used the catastrophe to frame the disaster as "divine punishment" (tenbatsu) for the hedonism and materialism caused by Westernized democracy. This provided them with a pretext to promote militarism and weakened the Taishō Democracy. In the infamous Amakasu Incident, military police murdered anarchist Sakae Ōsugi and his partner, Noe Itō, signaling an increase in political repression.

The election of Katō Komei as Prime Minister of Japan continued democratic reforms that had been advocated by influential individuals on the left. This culminated in the passage of universal male suffrage in March 1925. This bill gave all male subjects over the age of 25 the right to vote, provided they had lived in their electoral districts for at least one year and were not homeless. The electorate thereby increased from 3.3 million to 12.5 million.

In the political milieu of the day, there was a proliferation of new parties, including socialist and communist parties. Fear of a broader electorate, left-wing power, and the growing social change led to the passage of the Peace Preservation Law in 1925, which forbade any change in the political structure by forming and participating in groups that aimed to alter the kokutai or the abolition of private property. It was a pretext to suppress socialists, communists, and anti-colonial activists and over 70,000 people were arrested or detained. While the death penalty was technically never carried out judicially, many detainees died due to torture, severe prison conditions, or forced ideological "conversion".

In 1932, Park Chun-kum, a Korean, was elected to the House of Representatives in the 1932 Japanese general election as the first person elected from a colonial background. In 1935, democracy was introduced through limited elections in Taiwan and in response to Taiwanese public opinion, local assemblies were established. In 1942, 38 colonial people were elected to local assemblies of the Japanese homeland.

Unstable coalitions and divisiveness in the Diet led the Kenseikai (憲政会 Constitutional Government Association) and the Seiyū Hontō (政友本党 True Seiyūkai) to merge as the Rikken Minseitō (立憲民政党 Constitutional Democratic Party) in 1927. The Rikken Minseitō platform was committed to the liberal parliamentary system, democratic politics, and world peace. Meanwhile, the Rikken Seiyūkai (立憲政友会 Friends of Constitutional Government), dominant since 1900, ran on a conservative platform by supporting big government, large-scale public spending and bureaucratic interests. It championed industrial development through the Zaibatsu business conglomerates, promoted landholder interests and constitutionalism while generally opposed to rapid democratization and adopted pro-military stances later in its tenure. Thereafter, until 1932, the Rikken Seiyūkai and the Rikken Minseitō alternated in power. Both sides were despised by the militarists.

Despite the political realignments and hope for more orderly government, domestic economic crises plagued whichever party held power. Fiscal austerity programs and appeals for public support of such conservative government policies as the Peace Preservation Law—including reminders of the moral obligation to make sacrifices for the emperor and the state—were attempted as solutions.

=== Early Shōwa (1926–1941) ===
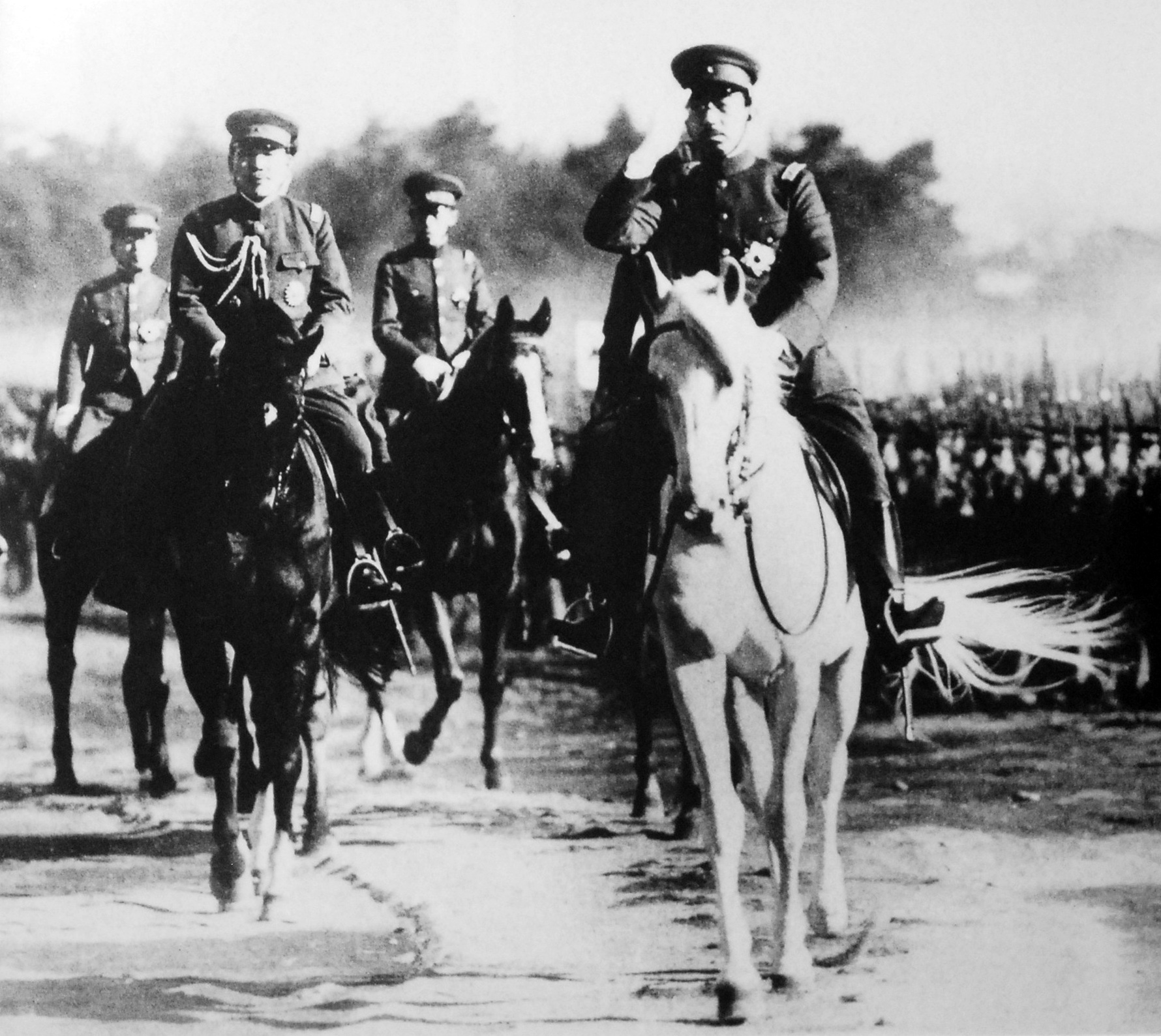
Emperor Shōwa during an army inspection on January 8, 1938

Hirohito ascended to the throne on 25 December 1926, upon the death of his father Emperor Taishō, beginning the Shōwa era. He would rule Japan as the 126th emperor to claim direct descent from Amaterasu, the Japanese goddess of the sun.

Overall, during the 1920s, Japan changed its direction toward a democratic system of government. However, parliamentary government was not rooted deeply enough to withstand the economic and political pressures of the 1930s, during which military leaders became increasingly influential. These shifts in power were made possible by the ambiguity and imprecision of the Meiji Constitution, particularly as regarded the position of the Emperor in relation to the constitution.

==== Nationalism and decline of democracy ====
Sadao Araki was an important figurehead and founder of the Army party and the most important militarist thinker in his time. His first ideological works date from his leadership of the Kōdōha (Imperial Benevolent Rule or Action Group), opposed by the Tōseiha (Control Group) led by General Kazushige Ugaki. He linked the ancient (bushido code) and contemporary local and German and Italian fascist ideals (see Kokkashugi), to form the ideological basis of the movement (Shōwa nationalism).

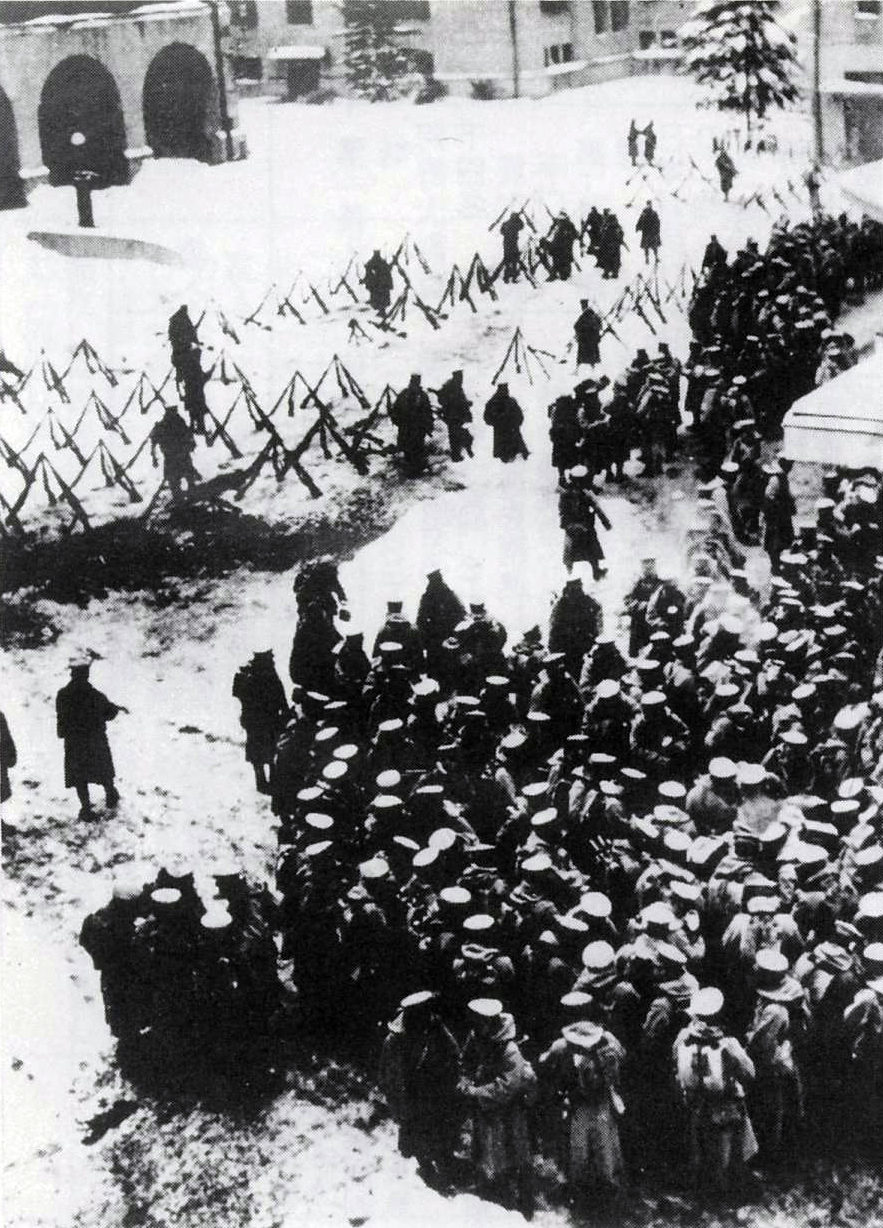
Rebel troops assembling at police headquarters during the February 26 incident

From September 1931, the Japanese were becoming more locked into the course that would lead them into the Second World War, with Araki leading the way. Increasing totalitarianism, ultranationalism, militarism, and expansionism were to become the rule, with fewer voices able to speak against it. In a September 23 news conference, Araki first mentioned the philosophy of "Kōdōha" (The Imperial Way Faction). The concept of Kodo linked the Emperor, the people, land, and morality as indivisible. This led to the creation of a "new" Shinto and increased Emperor worship.

In 1931, the ruling liberal Rikken Minseitō opposed the Mukden Incident, which was engineered by the military as a pretext for an invasion into Manchuria. The anti-war Foreign Minister Kijuro Shidehara and Prime Minister Wakatsuki Reijirō formally opposed the military's actions to seize Manchuria and aimed to keep the incident contained. Known for "Shidehara Diplomacy"—a policy of economic expansion and non-intervention in China—he tried to resolve the crisis through diplomatic negotiation. The army ignored the Cabinet's "non-expansion" policy and continued to expand the invasion, forcing the government into a position of helplessness. Strong criticism from military interests and public opinion regarding the handling of the crisis, combined with internal political sabotage, led to the resignation of the Wakatsuki Cabinet in December 1931 and ended liberal efforts at conciliation. Following the collapse of the government, the right-wing Rikken Seiyūkai led by Inukai Tsuyoshi took power, leading to a pro-military stance and the eventual establishment of the Manchukuo puppet state.

In the early months of 1932, ultra-nationalist extremists, led by radical Buddhist preacher Nisshō Inoue, aimed to assassinate 20 prominent wealthy businessmen and liberal politicians to end party democracy and restore power to the Emperor. The plot, known later as the League of Blood Incident (Ketsumeidan Jiken) eventually resulted in the murders of former Finance Minister Junnosuke Inoue and businessman Dan Takuma, that fueled rising militarism through the erosion of the rule of law and Taishō democratic institutions and the legitimization of violence as a patriotic act.

Despite Inukai being a right-winger, he remained committed to democracy rather than outright endorsed a military dictatorship desired by radicals. Inukai tried to restrain the Imperial Japanese Army and Navy from initiating unauthorized actions in China, specifically halted any expansion of the Manchurian Incident and sought to curb the political influence of junior officers who were acting on their own initiatives. Inukai withheld formal recognition of the newly created puppet state of Manchukuo, intending to find a diplomatic resolution to which both China and Japan could agree on. The move was seen as a major betrayal by the radical hardliners who wanted complete independence for Manchukuo. He then attempted to resolve tensions over the Shanghai Incident through diplomatic channels rather than military conquest, angering military hardliners.

On 15 May 1932, during a failed coup d'état attempt (the May 15 incident) by young militant naval officers, Prime Minister Inukai was assassinated, effectively ending Taishō democracy in the Empire of Japan. Civilian rule was replaced by "national unity" cabinets, which were dominated by bureaucrats and military leaders, accelerating Japan's shift toward militarism and imperialism.

On February 26, 1936, a coup d'état was attempted (the February 26 incident). Launched by the ultranationalist Kōdōha (Imperial Way faction) within the military, it ultimately failed due to the intervention of the Emperor. Kōdōha members were purged from the top military positions and the established Tōseiha (Control faction) gained dominance. Both had differing views on how the military should operated (Kōdōha's spiritual holy war versus Tōseiha mechanical industrialization) and the nature of the threats to the system (communist Soviet Union versus the Western naval powers). However, both factions believed in expansionism, a strong military, and an impending war. Kōdōha members, while removed from the military, still had political influence within the government.

By 1937, the state was effectively being transformed to serve the Army and the Emperor. Symbolic katana swords came back into fashion as the martial embodiment of these beliefs, and the Nambu pistol became its contemporary equivalent, with the implicit message that the Army doctrine of close combat would prevail. The final objective, as envisioned by Army thinkers such as Sadao Araki and right-wing line followers, was a return to the old Shogunate system, but in the form of a contemporary Military Shogunate. In such a government, the Emperor would once more be a figurehead (as in the Edo period). Real power would fall to a leader very similar to a führer or duce, though with the power less nakedly held. On the other hand, the traditionalist Navy militarists defended the Emperor and a constitutional monarchy with a significant religious aspect.

A third point of view was supported by Prince Chichibu, a brother of Emperor Shōwa, who repeatedly counseled him to implement a "direct imperial rule", even if it meant suspending the constitution.

===== One-party state =====
With the launching of the Imperial Rule Assistance Association as a ruling party in Japan on October 12, 1940, by Prime Minister Fumimaro Konoe, Japan would turn to a one-party form of government. There have been debates among historians over defining the political system of Japan as a dictatorship, as fascist, and as totalitarian.

The arguments in favor of the definitions "dictatorship" and "fascist" were "the subordination of both country and society to militarism, control by a rigid style of leadership exercising authoritarian discipline, and the most brutal treatment of occupied areas." The definition "fascist" is supported by Marxist analysis, and the debates on it were begun by Japanese Marxist historians, who noted the differences between Japanese emperor-system, where fascism developed out of absolutist bureaucratic structures, and European fascist dictatorships, but connected both to the crisis of monopoly capitalism of the 1930s. While Masao Maruyama in his influential works challenged Marxist interpretation, he agreed with the term "fascist", but contrasted "fascism from below" in Europe to "fascism from above" in Japan. According to him, the failure of the fascist coup in 1936 marked the beginning of fascization on the regime from within the state bureaucracy, and he explained the appeal of fascist ideology to the Japanese leadership "with its irrational atavistic elements, in terms of their lack of a modern consciousness." Since the 1970s, after some debates, the Japanese historians criticized such interpretation, but continued defending the definition "fascist", viewing fascism as the outgrowth of modernizing trends in the development of Japan's political and social system. Their understanding was not shared mainly by American historians, who believed the definition to be inadequate. These critics suggested other terms, such as totalitarianism, corporatism, and militarism. Robert Paxton wrote that Japan "is better understood" as a military dictatorship than a fascist regime, but the term "military dictatorship" has been criticized by such scholars as Ben-Ami Shillony; Edwin Palmer Hoyt uses the term "oligarchy" and notes that it was not led by a dictator, but by the officers known as gunbatsu.

The opponents, such as Stanley G. Payne, have noted that the Japanese far-right organizations lacked a mass movement similar to the mass Fascist movement in Europe. According to Payne, Japan was a "somewhat pluralistic authoritarian system which exhibited some of the characteristics of fascism, but it did not develop fascism's most distinctive and revolutionary aspects" and had more in common with the German Empire during World War I than with the Third Reich. It was noted that this political system lacked the figure of a single person with an absolute authority and a personality cult, since Hirohito couldn't be referred to as a dictator because of being a monarch, and since his authority existed along with party politics, while Hideki Tojo never had an absolute authority and was forced to resign, while the IRAA, according to Roger Griffin, was "little more than a bureaucratic fiction." S.J. Lee believes that the ideological base "was traditional", as opposed to "revolutionary" ideologies required by the Western theories of totalitarianism, "even if the methods of communication and control were modern and European," and that the traditional society of Japan was "to a large degree differential", while its institutions remained too elitist and conservative to follow such practices as a "democratic mass mobilization" characteristic of totalitarianism, so he defines this system as authoritarian as opposed to totalitarian. However, such Western historians as Griffin acknowledge that this system had traits of fascism; while designating Italy and Germany as the only fascist regimes, he calls Japan "para-fascist", a system which "emulated" fascist systems but was not one, similarly to Vichy France and Francoist Spain.

Elise K. Tipton rejects the terms totalitarian-authoritarian paradigm on the grounds that it presents a false understanding both of Nazi Germany and the Soviet Union and all the regimes called totalitarian (see Totalitarianism#Nazism and Fascism on this kind of critique), and the term "dictatorship", and instead proposes the term police state, which she believes to be more accurate. Michael Lucken calls Japan "the highly peculiar form of totalitarianism." However, according to him, "scholars today are hesitant to describe the regime as totalitarian": "only a handful of scholars specializing in Japan continue somewhat disparately to use the term, while others reject it entirely." He connects it to the policies of the U. S. during the occupation of Japan after World War II: while the American authorities labeled Germany "totalitarian", thus authorizing the term, they never officially did it to Japan, since this would make Hirohito responsible for the war and war crimes, what contradicted the plans of Douglas MacArthur; Hannah Arendt contributed to the exclusion of Japan from the list of totalitarian regimes by formulating the mainstream criterion of totalitarianism unapplicable to Japan. However, her theories gained less influence, so the Japanese historians find the term applicable, what creates a discrepancy between Japanese and Western historiographies. According to Lucken, "The concept of totality in Japanese wartime thinking did not refer to an enclosed whole, like a set of marbles in a bag. On the contrary, it was an open and organic whole that resists any narrow definition. Consequently, if we are able to speak of Japanese totalitarianism, it was all the more total for having consistently resisted such a label."

In 1940, Japan celebrated the 2600th anniversary of Jimmu's ascension, despite the fact that Jimmu was widely regarded as a mythological figure, and the Japanese promoted the world domination slogan Hakkō ichiu. In 1941, the Japanese government charged Tsuda Sōkichi, the one historian who dared to challenge Jimmu's existence publicly. Tsuda put forward the then-controversial theory that accounts in the Kojiki chronicle were not based on history (as Edo period kokugaku and State Shinto ideology believed) but rather on propagandistic myths concocted to explain and legitimize the rule of the imperial dynasty. Tsuda also saw the deity Susanoo as a negative figure, arguing that he was created to serve as the rebellious opposite of the imperial ancestress Amaterasu. Tsuda's view of history has become mainstream after World War II. Many scholars today believe that the mythology of the heavenly plane of Takamagahara in Kojiki was created by the ruling class to make people believe that the class was precious for originating there. During the Second Sino-Japanese War and the Second World War, the firm Iwanami Shoten was repeatedly censored because of its positions against the war and the Emperor. Publisher Shigeo Iwanami was sentenced to two months in prison (later acquitted) for the publication of Tsuda's banned works. Shortly before his death in 1946, he founded the newspaper Sekai, which had a great influence in post-war Japanese intellectual circles.

==== Economic factors ====
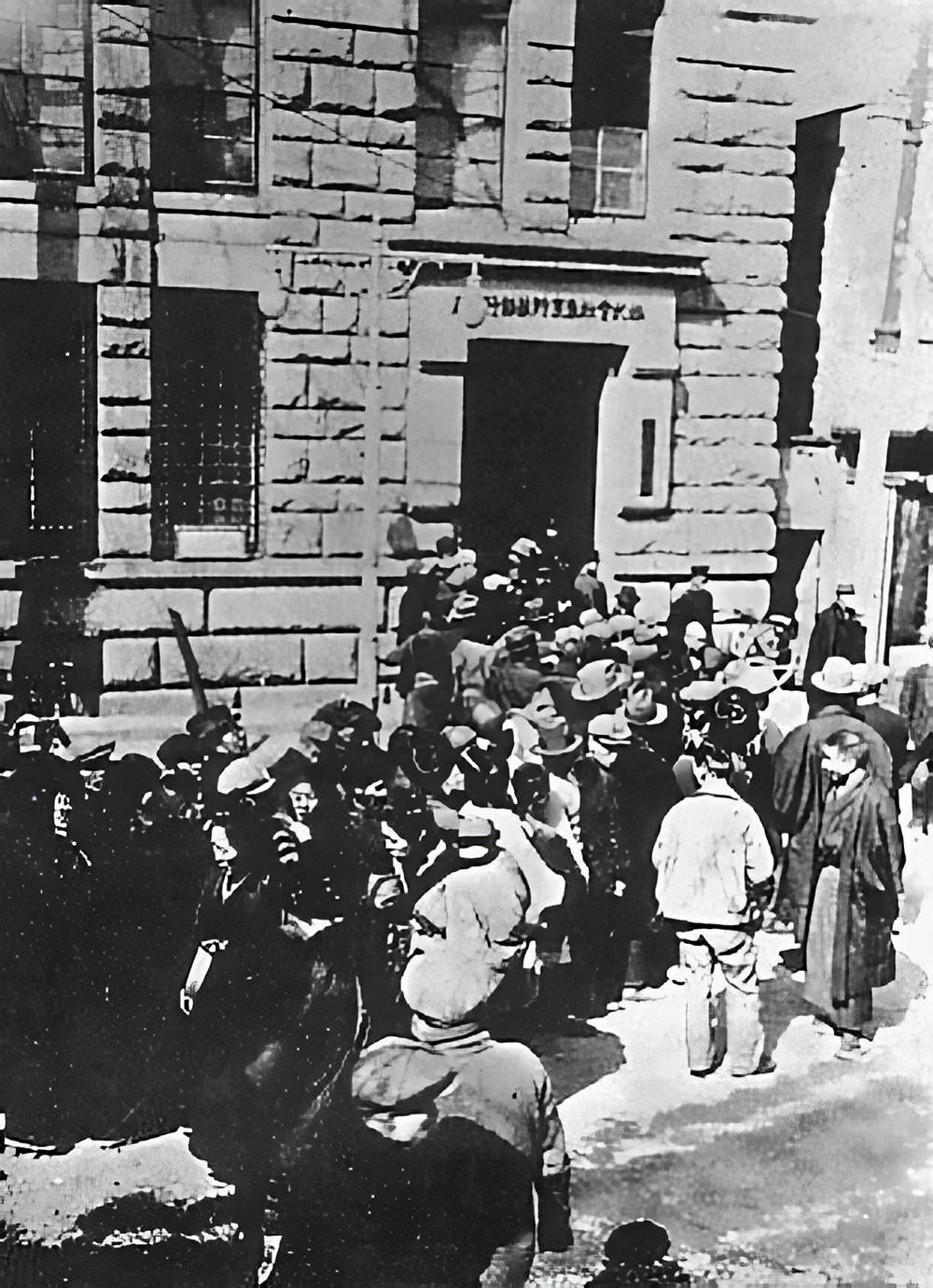
A bank run during the Shōwa financial crisis, March 1927

During the 1920s, the whole global economy was dubbed as "a decade of global uncertainty". At the same time, the zaibatsu trading groups (principally Mitsubishi, Mitsui, Sumitomo, and Yasuda) looked toward great expansion. Their main concern was a shortage of raw materials. Prime Minister Fumimaro Konoe combined social concerns with the needs of capital, and planned for expansion. Economic growth was stimulated by certain domestic policies and it can be seen in the steady and progressive increase of materials such as in the iron, steel and chemical industry.

The main goals of Japan's expansionism were acquisition and protection of spheres of influence, maintenance of territorial integrity, acquisition of raw materials, and access to Asian markets. Western nations, notably the United Kingdom, France, and the United States, had for long exhibited great interest in the commercial opportunities in China and other parts of Asia. These opportunities had attracted Western investment because of the availability of raw materials for both domestic production and re-export to Asia. Japan desired these opportunities in planning the development of the Greater East Asia Co-Prosperity Sphere.

The Great Depression, just as in many other countries, hindered Japan's economic growth. The Japanese Empire's main problem lay in that rapid industrial expansion had turned the country into a major manufacturing and industrial power that required raw materials; however, these had to be obtained from overseas, as there was a critical lack of natural resources on the home islands.

In the 1920s and 1930s, Japan needed to import raw materials such as iron, rubber, and oil to maintain strong economic growth. Most of these resources came from the United States. The Japanese felt that acquiring resource-rich territories would establish economic self-sufficiency and independence, and they hoped to jump-start the nation's economy in the midst of the depression. As a result, Japan set its sights on East Asia, specifically Manchuria with its many resources; Japan needed these resources to continue its economic development and maintain national integrity.

A severe agricultural depression that began in 1926 devastated the Japanese economy. Rural farmers, already struggling with low prices for commodities such as rice faced massive poverty, high debt and an inability to pay rent. Many rural inhabitants believed that democracy had failed them, and they felt resentment toward elites and party politicians whom they viewed as selfish and un-Japanese. A large portion of the Japanese army's lower-ranking officers and soldiers came from these poor, rural farming families and they brought their grievances against the government into the army, causing the military to become a center of dissatisfaction against the civilian government. Militarists and ultranationalists (such as the Black Dragon Society) took advantage of this anger by promising that expansion in Manchuria and China would solve Japan's economic problems that the party politicians seemed unable to resolve.

==== Architecture ====
In the early twentieth century, a distinctive style of architecture was developed for the empire. Now referred to as Imperial Crown Style (帝冠様式, teikan yōshiki), before the end of World War II, it was originally referred to as Emperor's Crown Amalgamate Style, and sometimes Emperor's Crown Style (帝冠式, Teikanshiki). The style is identified by Japanese-style roofing on top of Neoclassical styled buildings; and can have a centrally elevated structure with a pyramidal dome. The prototype for this style was developed by architect Shimoda Kikutaro in his proposal for the Imperial Diet Building (present National Diet Building) in 1920 – although his proposal was ultimately rejected. Outside of the Japanese mainland, in places like Taiwan and Korea, Imperial Crown Style architecture often included regional architectural elements.

==== Prewar expansionism ====
===== Manchuria =====
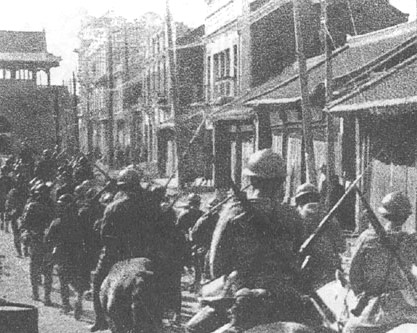
Japanese troops entering Shenyang, Northeast China during the Mukden Incident, 1931

In 1931, Japan, under a false pretext of claimed Chinese sabotage of a railway bridge in Mukden, launched a limited invasion into China that was already in a state of civil war. Mid-level officers of the Kwantung Army had aimed to seize the resource-rich region to secure economic stability, counter the Soviet Union influence and expand the Japanese Empire, all while bypassing civilian government oversight. They soon conquered Northeast China (Manchuria) with little resistance. Japan claimed that this invasion was a liberation of the local Manchus from the Chinese, although the majority of the population were Han Chinese as a result of the large scale settlement of Chinese in Manchuria in the 19th century.

Japan then established a puppet state called Manchukuo (Chinese: 滿洲國), and installed the last Manchu Emperor of China, Puyi, as the official head of state. Rehe, a Chinese territory bordering Manchukuo, was taken in 1933. This puppet regime had to carry on a protracted pacification campaign against the Anti-Japanese Volunteer Armies in Manchuria. In 1936, Japan created a similar Mongolian puppet state in Inner Mongolia named Mengjiang (Chinese: 蒙疆), which was predominantly Chinese as a result of recent Han immigration to the area. At that time, East Asians were banned from immigration to North America and Australia, but the newly established Manchukuo was open to immigration of Asians. Japan had an emigration plan to encourage colonization; the Japanese population in Manchuria subsequently grew to 850,000. With rich natural resources and labor force in Manchuria, army-owned corporations turned Manchuria into a solid material support machine of the Japanese Army.

The invasion was condemned by the League of Nations, and Japan soon withdrew on February 24, 1933 after the Lytton Report was ratified by the League.

===== Second Sino-Japanese War =====
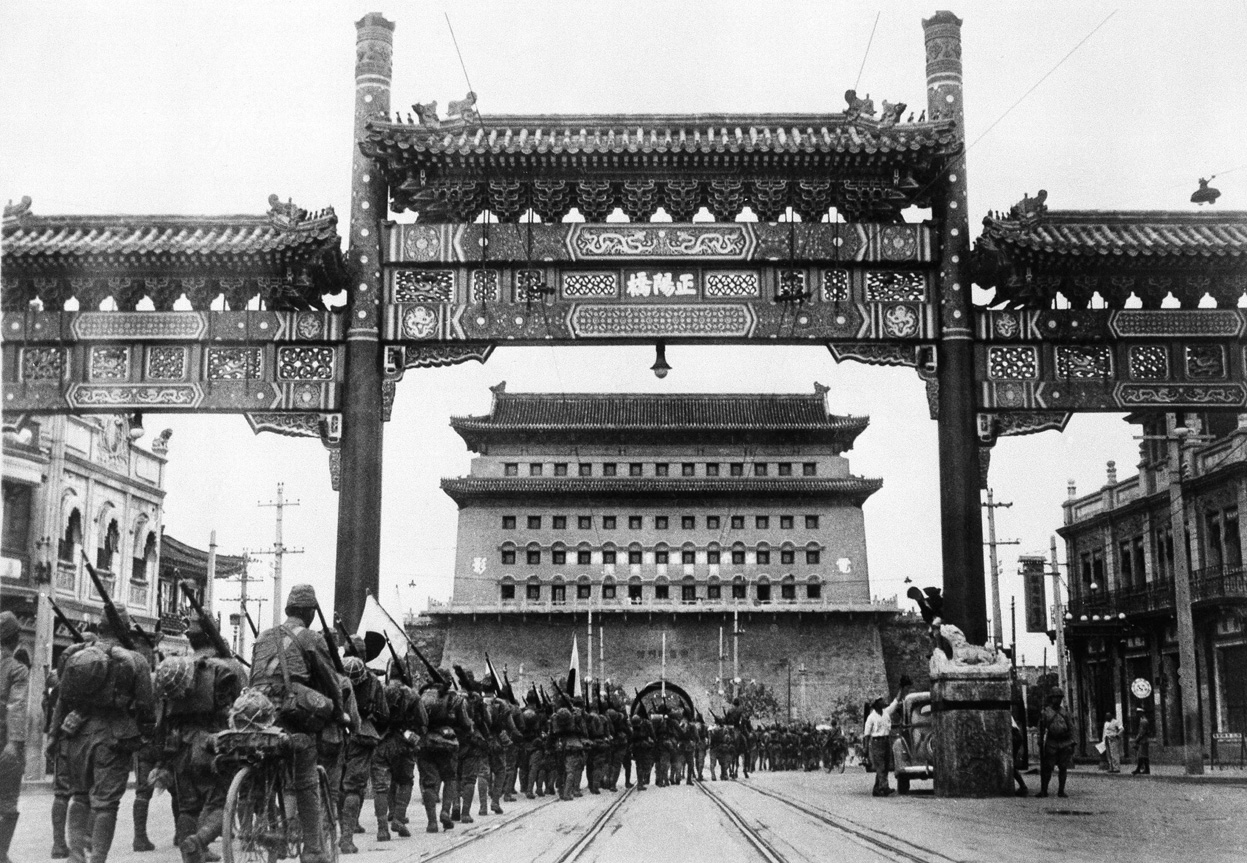
The Japanese occupation of Beiping (Beijing) in China, on August 13, 1937. Japanese troops are shown passing from Beiping into the Tartar City through Zhengyangmen, the main gate leading onward to the palaces in the Forbidden City.

Japan invaded China proper in 1937, beginning a war against both Chiang Kai-shek's Nationalists and the Communists of Mao Zedong's united front. On December 13 of that same year, the Nationalist capital of Nanjing surrendered to Japanese troops. In the event known as the Nanjing Massacre, Japanese troops killed many tens-of-thousands of people associated with the defending garrison. It is estimated that around 100,000 to 200,000 including civilians, have been killed. In total, an estimated 20 million Chinese, mostly civilians, were killed during World War II. A puppet state was set up in China quickly, headed by Wang Jingwei. The Second Sino-Japanese War continued into World War II with the Communists and Nationalists in a temporary and uneasy nominal alliance against the Japanese.

===== Clashes with the Soviet Union =====
In 1938, the Japanese 19th Division entered territory claimed by the Soviet Union, leading to the Battle of Lake Khasan. This incursion was founded in the Japanese belief that the Soviet Union misinterpreted the demarcation of the boundary, as stipulated in the Treaty of Peking, between Imperial Russia and Manchu China (and subsequent supplementary agreements on demarcation), and that the demarcation markers were tampered with.

On May 11, 1939, in the Nomonhan Incident (Battle of Khalkhin Gol), a Mongolian cavalry unit of some 70 to 90 men entered the disputed area in search of grazing for their horses, and encountered Manchukuoan cavalry, who drove them out. Two days later the Mongolian force returned, and the Manchukoans were unable to evict them.

The IJA 23rd Division and other units of the Kwantung Army then became involved. Joseph Stalin ordered Stavka, the Red Army's high command, to develop a plan for a counterstrike against the Japanese. In late August, Georgy Zhukov employed encircling tactics that made skillful use of superior artillery, armor, and air forces; this offensive nearly annihilated the 23rd Division and decimated the IJA 7th Division. On September 15, an armistice was arranged after Japan recognized it could not effectively fight the Soviet Union while engaged in China.

Nearly two years later, on April 13, 1941, the parties signed the Soviet–Japanese Neutrality Pact, in which the Soviet Union pledged to respect the territorial integrity and inviolability of Manchukuo, while Japan agreed similarly for the Mongolian People's Republic.

===== Korean rebellion =====
By the 1930s, the Korean resistance against Japan had evolved into a full armed struggle by the exiled Provisional Government of the Republic of Korea (KPG) whose armed wing conducted underground sabotage against the Japanese on the occupied Korean Peninsula. The KPG, based in Chongqing, and backed by the Allied forces would formally declared war on Japan in 1941, while others, such as the communists (including one that goes by the name of Kim il-Sung) would engaged in guerrilla warfare against Japan in Manchuria.

===== Tripartite Pact =====
Signing ceremony for the Tripartite Pact, September 27, 1940, in Berlin, Nazi Germany

In 1938, Japan prohibited the expulsion of the Jews in Japan, Manchuria, and China in accordance with the spirit of racial equality on which Japan had insisted for many years.

The Second Sino-Japanese War had seen tensions rise between Imperial Japan and the United States; events such as the Panay incident and the Nanjing Massacre turned American public opinion against Japan. With the occupation of French Indochina in the years of 1940–41, and with the continuing war in China, the United States and its allies placed embargoes on Japan of strategic materials such as scrap tin metal and oil, which were vitally needed for the war effort. The Japanese were faced with the option of either withdrawing from China and losing face or seizing and securing new sources of raw materials in the resource-rich, European-controlled colonies of Southeast Asia—specifically British Malaya and the Dutch East Indies (modern-day Indonesia).

On September 27, 1940, Japan signed the Tripartite Pact with Germany and Italy. The objectives were to "establish and maintain a new order of things" in their respective world regions and spheres of influence, with Germany and Italy in Europe, and Japan in Asia. The Anti-Comintern Pact had already been signed in 1936. The signatories of this alliance became known as the Axis powers. The pact called for mutual protection—if any one of the member powers was attacked by a country not already at war, excluding the Soviet Union, and for technological and economic cooperation among the signatories.

=== World War II (1941–1945) ===
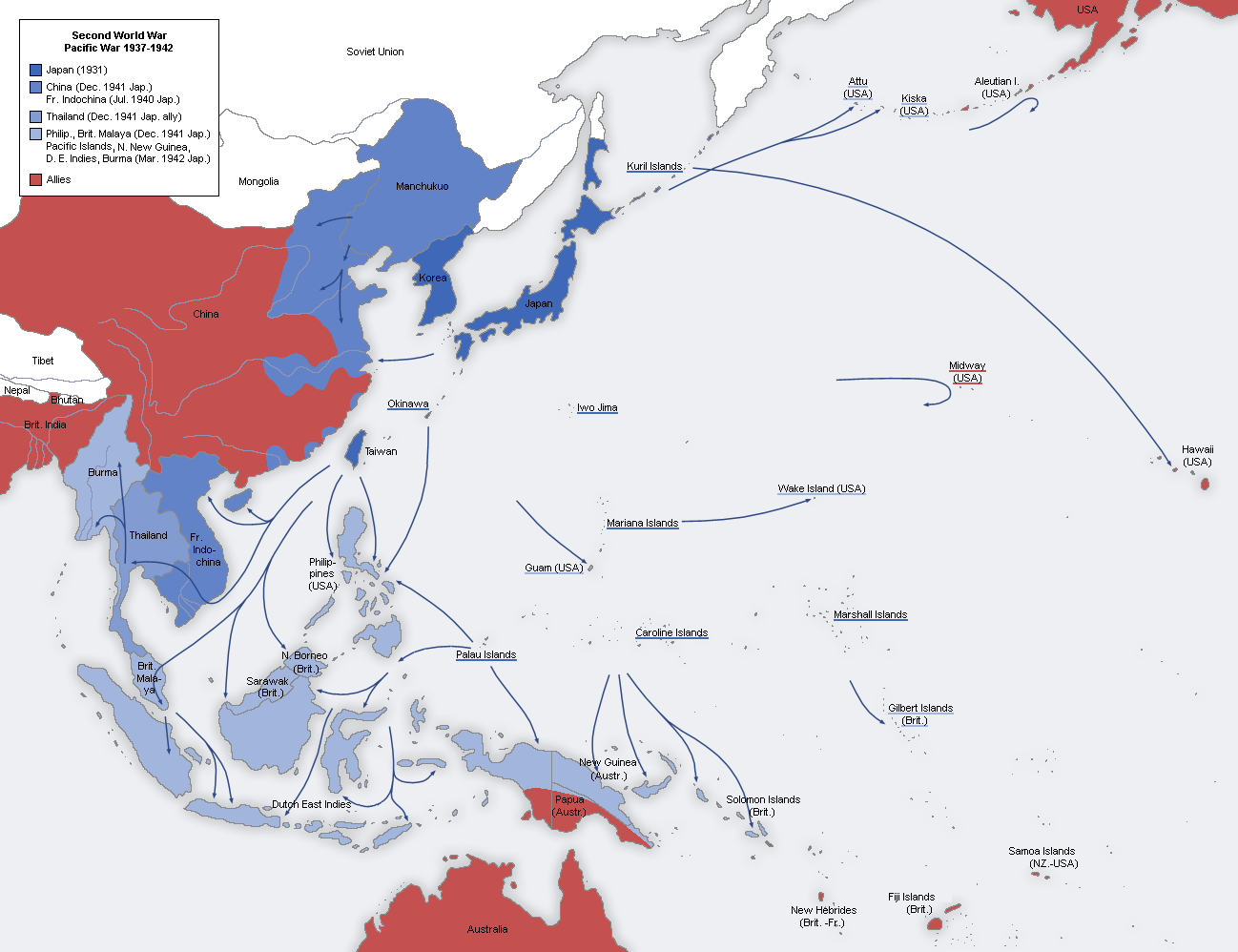
Map of Japanese conquests from 1937 to 1942

On November 5, 1941, Yamamoto issued his "Top Secret Operation Order no. 1" to the Combined Fleet. This document lays out the position that the Empire of Japan must drive out Britain and America from Greater East Asia, and hasten the settlement of China. Once Britain and America were driven out from the Philippines and Dutch East Indies, an independent, self-supporting economic entity was to be established, mirroring the Greater East Asia Co-Prosperity Sphere.

Facing an oil embargo by the United States and its allies as well as dwindling domestic reserves, the Japanese government decided to execute a plan developed by Isoroku Yamamoto to attack the United States Pacific Fleet in Hawaii. While the United States was neutral and continued negotiating with Japan for possible peace in Asia, the Imperial Japanese Navy at the same time made its surprise attack on Pearl Harbor in Honolulu on December 7, 1941. As a result, the U.S. battleship fleet was decimated and almost 2,500 people died in the attack that day. The primary objective of the attack was to incapacitate the United States long enough for Japan to establish its long-planned South East Asian empire and defensible buffer zones. The American public saw the attack as barbaric and treacherous and rallied against the Japanese. Four days later, Adolf Hitler of Germany, and Benito Mussolini of Italy declared war on the United States, merging the separate conflicts into a total world war. The United States entered the European Theatre and Pacific Theater in full force, thereby bringing the United States to World War II on the side of the Allies.

As it launched the surprise attack on Pearl Harbor, the Japanese were well aware that the United States had the capability to mount a counter-offensive. However, it believed that it could maintain its defensive perimeter and push any attempt by the British and Americans that could incur enough losses to make the Allied forces consider making peace on the basis of Japan's retainment of the territories she had gained.

==== Japanese conquests ====
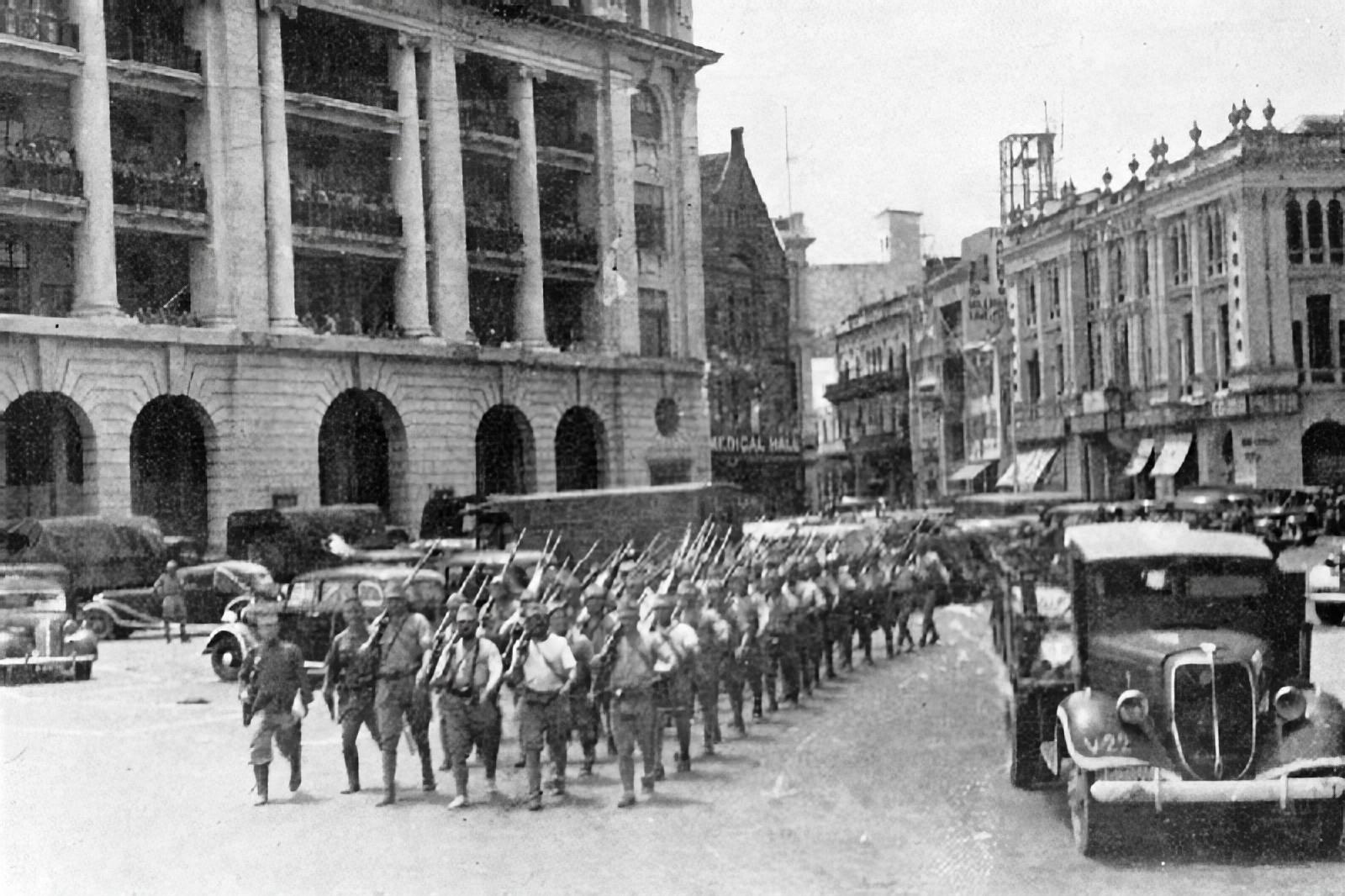
Victorious Japanese troops marching through the city center of Singapore following the city's capture in February 1942

Following the attack on Pearl Harbor, the Japanese launched offensives against Allied forces in East and Southeast Asia, with simultaneous attacks in British Hong Kong, British Malaya and the Philippines. Hong Kong surrendered to the Japanese on December 25. In Malaya the Japanese overwhelmed an Allied army composed of British, Indian, Australian and Malay forces. The Japanese were quickly able to advance down the Malayan Peninsula, forcing the Allied forces to retreat towards British Singapore. The Allies lacked aircover and tanks; the Japanese had complete air superiority. The sinking of HMS Prince of Wales and HMS Repulse on December 10, 1941, led to the east coast of Malaya being exposed to Japanese landings and the elimination of British naval power in the area. By the end of January 1942, the last Allied forces crossed the strait of Johore and into Singapore.

On January 11, 1942, a Japanese submarine shelled the United States naval Station at Pago Pago in Samoa, suggesting that the Japanese were advancing to the direction of Australia and nearby Oceanic regions.

In the Philippines, the Japanese pushed the combined American-Filipino force towards the Bataan Peninsula and later the island of Corregidor. By January 1942, General Douglas MacArthur and President Manuel L. Quezon were forced to flee in the face of Japanese advance. This marked one of the worst defeats suffered by the Americans, leaving over 70,000 American and Filipino prisoners of war in the custody of the Japanese. On February 15, 1942, Singapore, due to the overwhelming superiority of Japanese forces and encirclement tactics, fell to the Japanese, causing the largest surrender of British-led military personnel in history. An estimated 80,000 Australian, British and Indian troops were taken as prisoners of war, joining 50,000 taken in the Japanese invasion of Malaya (modern day Malaysia). The Japanese then seized the key oil production zones of Borneo, Central Java, Malang, Cebu, Sumatra, and Dutch New Guinea of the late Dutch East Indies, defeating the Dutch forces. However, Allied sabotage had made it difficult for the Japanese to restore oil production to its pre-war peak. The Japanese then consolidated its lines of supply through capturing key islands of the Pacific, including Guadalcanal.

==== Tide turns ====
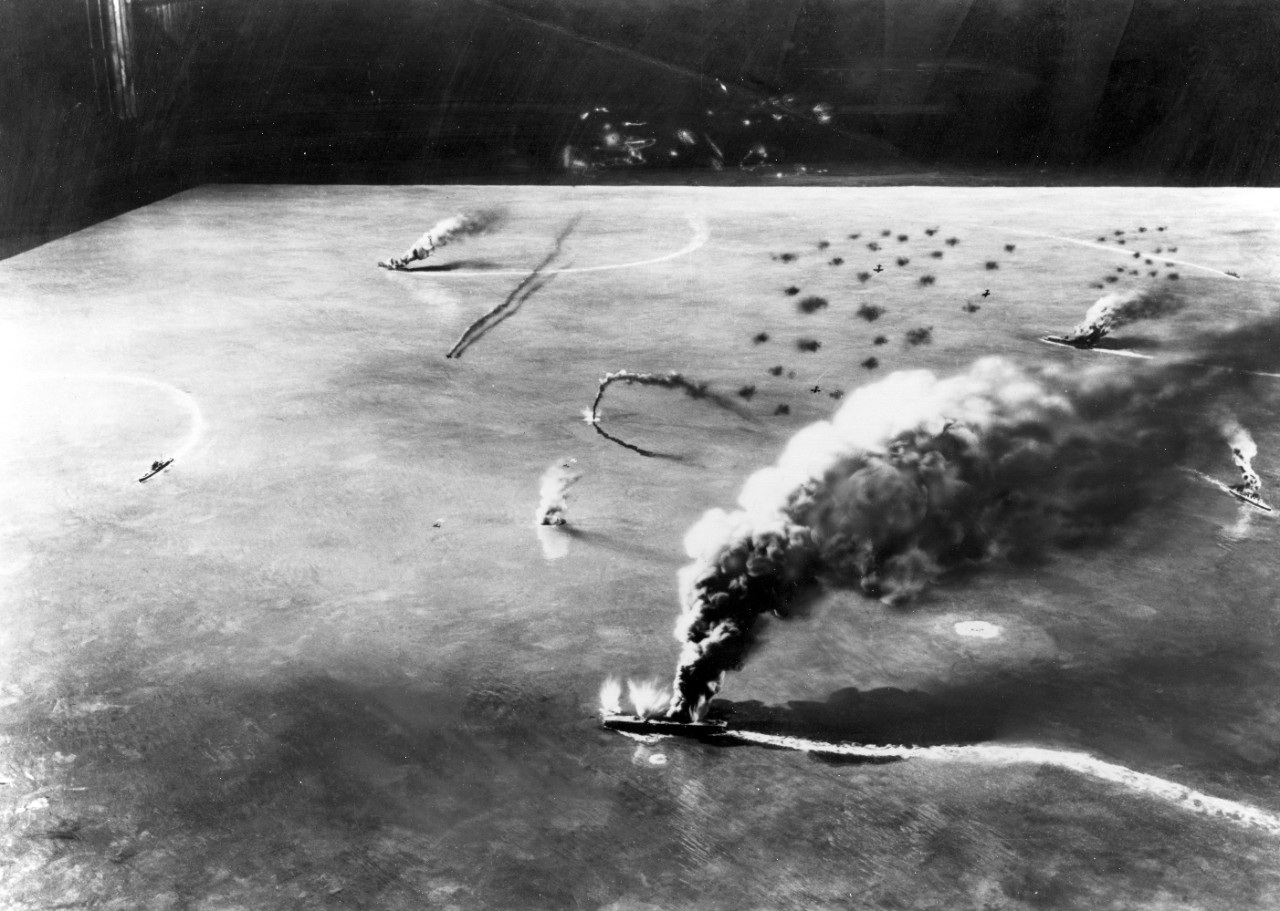
A model representing the attack by dive bombers from USS Yorktown and USS Enterprise on the Japanese aircraft carriers Sōryū, Akagi and Kaga in the morning of June 4, 1942, during the Battle of Midway

Japanese military strategists were keenly aware of the unfavorable discrepancy between the industrial potential of Japan and the United States. They reasoned that Japanese success hinged on its ability to extend the strategic advantage gained at Pearl Harbor with additional rapid strategic victories. The Japanese Command reasoned that only decisive destruction of the United States' Pacific Fleet and conquest of its remote outposts would ensure that the Japanese Empire would not be overwhelmed by America's industrial might.

In April 1942, Japan was bombed for the first time in the Doolittle Raid. During the same month, after the Japanese victory in the Battle of Bataan, the Bataan Death March was conducted, where 5,650 to 18,000 Filipinos died under the rule of the imperial army. In May 1942, failure to decisively defeat the Allies at the Battle of the Coral Sea, in spite of Japanese numerical superiority, equated to a strategic defeat for the Japanese. This setback was followed in June 1942 by the catastrophic loss of four fleet carriers at the Battle of Midway, the first decisive defeat for the Imperial Japanese Navy. It proved to be the turning point of the war as the Navy lost its offensive strategic capability and never managed to reconstruct the "'critical mass' of both large numbers of carriers and well-trained air groups".

Australian land forces defeated Japanese Marines in New Guinea at the Battle of Milne Bay in September 1942, which was the first land defeat suffered by the Japanese in the Pacific. Additional victories by the Allies at Guadalcanal in September 1942 and New Guinea in 1943 put the Empire of Japan on the defensive for the remainder of the war, with Guadalcanal in particular sapping its already-limited oil supplies. During 1943 and 1944, Allied forces, backed by the industrial might and vast raw material resources of the United States, advanced steadily towards Japan. The Sixth United States Army, led by General MacArthur, landed on Leyte on October 20, 1944. The Palawan massacre was committed by the imperial army against Filipinos in December 1944. In the subsequent months, during the Philippines campaign (1944–45), the Allies, including the combined United States forces together with the native guerrilla units, recaptured the Philippines.

==== Surrender ====
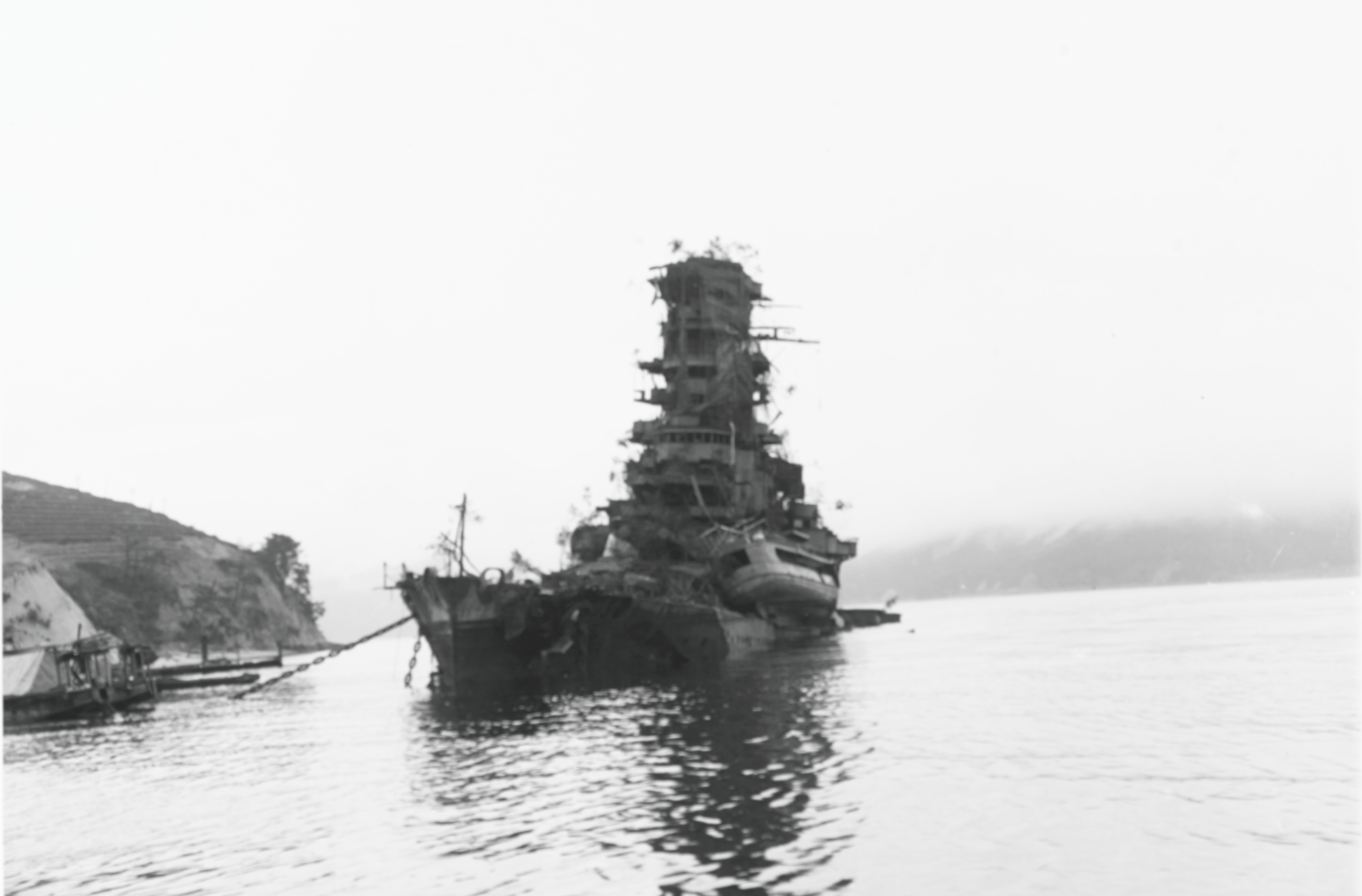
The rebuilt battlecruiser Haruna sank at her moorings in the naval base of Kure on July 24 during a series of bombings.

By 1944, the Allies had seized or bypassed and neutralized many of Japan's strategic bases through amphibious landings and bombardment. This, coupled with the losses inflicted by Allied submarines on Japanese shipping routes, began to strangle Japan's economy and undermine its ability to supply its army.

By early 1945, the US Marines had wrested control of the Ogasawara Islands in several hard-fought island-hopping battles such as the Battle of Iwo Jima, marking the beginning of the fall of the islands of Japan. After securing airfields in Saipan and Guam in the summer of 1944, the United States Army Air Forces conducted an intense strategic bombing campaign by having B-29 Superfortress bombers in nighttime low altitude incendiary raids, burning Japanese cities in an effort to pulverize Japan's war industry and shatter its morale.

The Operation Meetinghouse raid on Tokyo on the night of March 9–10, 1945, led to the deaths of approximately 120,000 civilians. Approximately 350,000–500,000 civilians died in 67 Japanese cities as a result of the incendiary bombing campaign on Japan. Concurrent with these attacks, Japan's vital coastal shipping operations were severely hampered with extensive aerial mining by the US's Operation Starvation. Regardless, these efforts did not succeed in persuading the Japanese military to surrender.

In mid-August 1945, the United States dropped nuclear weapons on the Japanese cities of Hiroshima and Nagasaki. These bombings were the first and, remained to the present day, the only combat use of nuclear weaponry. These two bombs killed approximately 120,000 people in a matter of seconds, and as many as a result of nuclear radiation in the following weeks, months and years. The bombs killed as many as 140,000 people in Hiroshima and 80,000 in Nagasaki by the end of 1945.

At the same time, during the Yalta Conference, the US, the UK, and the USSR (Soviet Union) had agreed that the USSR would enter the war on Japan within three months of the defeat of Germany in Europe. This Soviet–Japanese War led to the fall of Japan's Manchurian occupation, Soviet occupation of South Sakhalin island, and a real, imminent threat of Soviet invasion of the home islands of Japan. This was a significant factor for some internal parties in the Japanese decision to surrender to the US and gain some protection, rather than face simultaneous Soviet invasion as well as defeat by the US and its allies. Likewise, the superior numbers of the armies of the Soviet Union in Europe was a factor in the US decision to demonstrate the use of atomic weapons to the USSR, just as the Allied victory in Europe was evolving into the division of Germany and Berlin, the division of Europe with the Iron Curtain and the subsequent Cold War.

Having ignored (mokusatsu) the Potsdam Declaration, the Empire of Japan surrendered and ended World War II after the atomic bombings of Hiroshima and Nagasaki, the declaration of war by the Soviet Union and subsequent invasion of Manchuria and other territories. In a national radio address on August 15, Hirohito announced the surrender to the Japanese people by Gyokuon-hōsō.

=== End of the Empire of Japan ===
==== Occupation of Japan ====
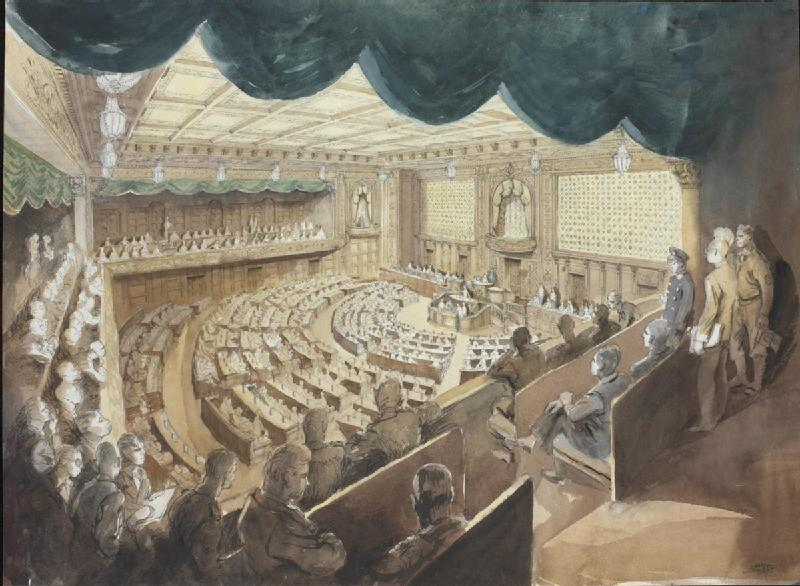
A drawing depicting a speech in the Imperial Japanese Diet on November 1, 1945, following the end of the Second World War. In the foreground are several Allied soldiers watching the proceedings from the back of the balcony.

A period known as occupied Japan followed after the war, largely spearheaded by US Army General Douglas MacArthur to revise the Japanese constitution and democratized the nation. The Allied occupation, including concurrent economic and political assistance, continued until 1952. Allied forces ordered Japan to abolish the Meiji Constitution and enforce the 1946 Constitution of Japan. This new constitution was imposed by the United States under the supervision of MacArthur. MacArthur included Article 9 which changed Japan into a pacifist country.

Upon adoption of the 1947 constitution, the Empire of Japan was dissolved and became simply the modern state of Japan. With the formal surrender before, the empire's territory was much reduced to the Japanese archipelago; mostly the islands of Honshu, Hokkaido, Kyushu, and Shikoku. The Korean Peninsula was liberated from Japanese rule back in 1945 but was later divided and occupied by the United States in the South and the Soviet Union in the North, separated by the 38th parallel. Taiwan was effectively placed back under administrative control by the Republic of China. It was officially confirmed with the 1951 Treaty of San Francisco, a peace treaty that officially ended hostilities, terminated Japan's status as an imperial power and a promise to restore its sovereignty a year later, while addressing territorial renunciations and postwar reparations. The Kuril Islands had historically belonged to Japan and were first inhabited by the Ainu people before coming under the control of the Matsumae clan during the Edo Period. The islands were invaded by the Soviet Union following the Soviet–Japanese War, and Japan renounced all rights to the Kuril Islands in the treaty, but since the Soviet Union was not a signature to the treaty, and the Northern Territories were never explicitly included in the renunciation or in the Soviet–Japanese Joint Declaration of 1956, its legal status remained contested to the present day.

Japan adopted a parliamentary-based political system, and the role of the Emperor became symbolic. The US occupation forces were fully responsible for protecting Japan from external threats. Japan only had a minor police force for domestic security. Japan was then placed under the sole control of the United States. This was the only time in Japanese history that it was occupied by a foreign power. The occupation ended in 1952 and Japan officially became a US ally in the Asia Pacific region.

General MacArthur later commended the new Japanese government that he helped establish and the new Japanese period when he was about to send the American forces to the Korean War:

The Japanese people, since the war, have undergone the greatest reformation recorded in modern history. With a commendable will, eagerness to learn, and marked capacity to understand, they have, from the ashes left in war's wake, erected in Japan an edifice dedicated to the supremacy of individual liberty and personal dignity; and in the ensuing process there has been created a truly representative government committed to the advance of political morality, freedom of economic enterprise, and social justice. Politically, economically, and socially Japan is now abreast of many free nations of the earth and will not again fail the universal trust. ... I sent all four of our occupation divisions to the Korean battlefront without the slightest qualms as to the effect of the resulting power vacuum upon Japan. The results fully justified my faith. I know of no nation more serene, orderly, and industrious, nor in which higher hopes can be entertained for future constructive service in the advance of the human race.

For historian John W. Dower:

In retrospect, apart from the military officer corps, the purge of alleged militarists and ultranationalists that was conducted under the Occupation had relatively small impact on the long-term composition of men of influence in the public and private sectors. The purge initially brought new blood into the political parties, but this was offset by the return of huge numbers of formerly purged conservative politicians to national as well as local politics in the early 1950s. In the bureaucracy, the purge was negligible from the outset. ... In the economic sector, the purge similarly was only mildly disruptive, affecting less than sixteen hundred individuals spread among some four hundred companies. Everywhere one looks, the corridors of power in postwar Japan are crowded with men whose talents had already been recognized during the war years, and who found the same talents highly prized in the 'new' Japan.

== Government ==
=== Emperors ===
Posthumous name^{1}	Given name^{2}	Childhood name^{3}	Period of reign	Era name^{4}
Meiji (明治天皇)	Mutsuhito (睦仁)	Sachi-no-miya (祐宮)	1868–1912 (1890–1912)^{5}	Meiji
Taisho (大正天皇)	Yoshihito (嘉仁)	Haru-no-miya (明宮)	1912–1926	Taishō
Shōwa (昭和天皇)	Hirohito (裕仁)	Michi-no-miya (迪宮)	1926–1989^{6}	Shōwa
1 Each posthumous name was given after the respective era names as Ming and Qing Dynasties of China. 2 The Japanese imperial family name has no surname or dynastic name. 3 Emperor Meiji was known only by the appellation Sachi-no-miya from his birth until November 11, 1860, when he was proclaimed heir apparent to Emperor Kōmei and received the personal name Mutsuhito. 4 No multiple era names were given for each reign after Emperor Meiji. 5 Constitutionally; 6 Constitutionally. The reign of the Shōwa Emperor continued until 1989 since he did not abdicate after World War II. However, he lost his status as a living god and influence on politics after the 1947 constitution was adopted.

=== Political ===
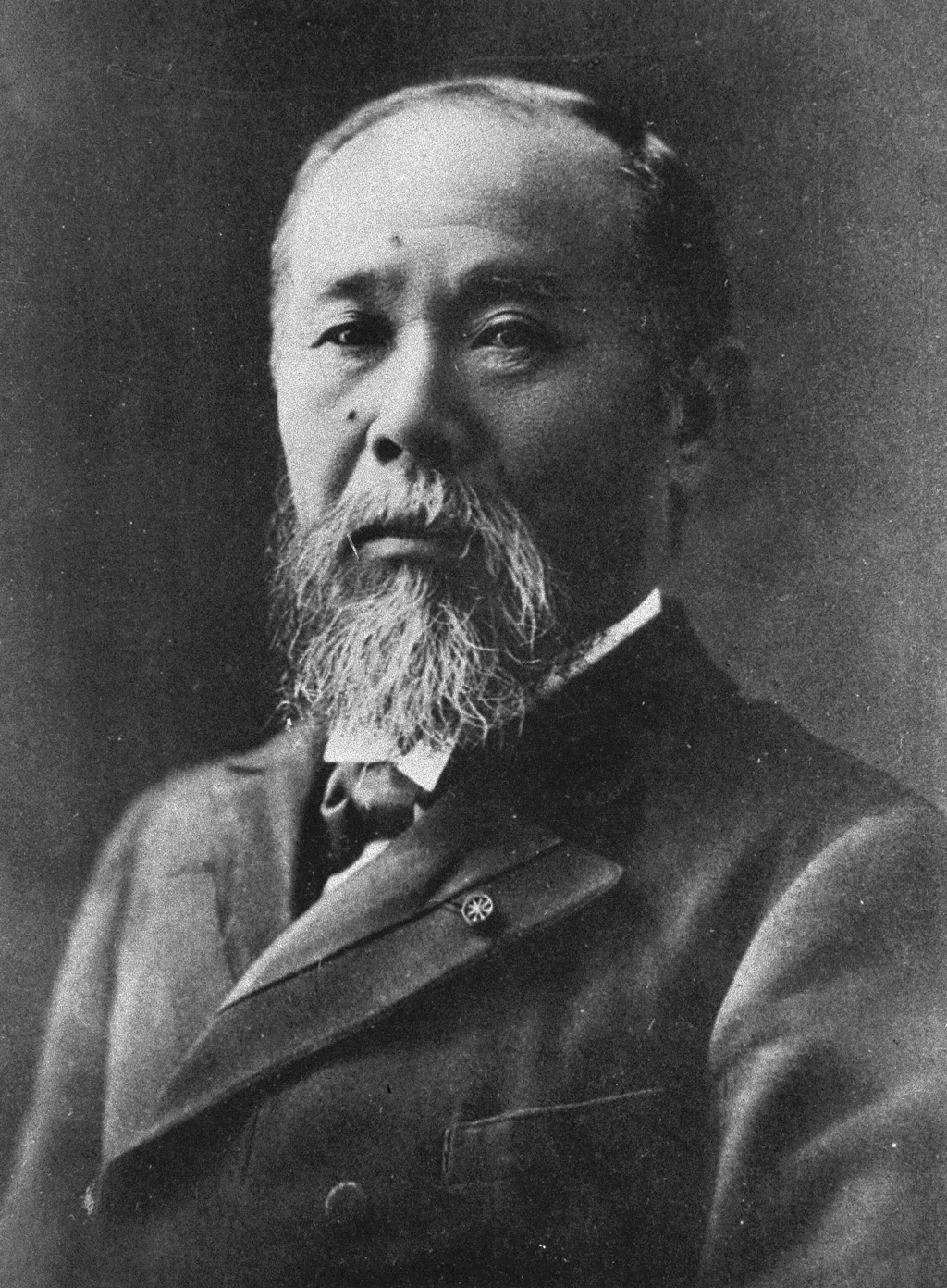
Prince Itō Hirobumi

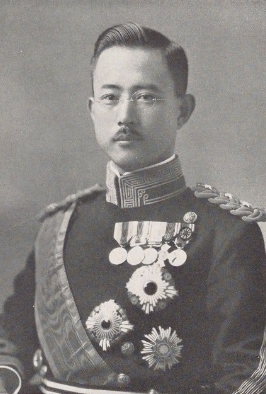
Prince Kitashirakawa Naruhisa, the 3rd head of a collateral branch of the Japanese Imperial Family

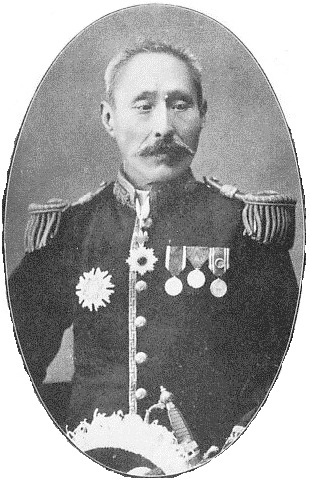
Marquess Michitsune Koga, a member of the Imperial Family, descending from Emperor Murakami. He was the former Governor of Tokyo Prefecture.

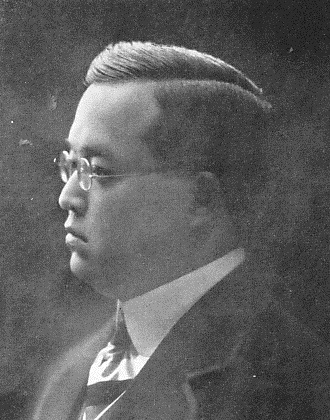
Count Nagayoshi Ogasawara, a member of the Imperial Family

In the administration of Japan dominated by the military political movement during World War II, the civil central government was under the management of military men and their right-wing civilian allies, along with members of the nobility and Imperial Family. The Emperor was in the center of this power structure as Supreme Commander-in-Chief of the Imperial Armed Forces and supreme head of state.

==== Early period ====
- Prince Kitashirakawa Yoshihisa
- Prince Kitashirakawa Naruhisa
- Prince Komatsu Akihito
- Marquess Michitsune Koga
- Prince Yamagata Aritomo
- Prince Itō Hirobumi
- Prince Katsura Tarō

==== World War II ====
- Prince Fumimaro Konoe
- Kōki Hirota
- Hideki Tojo

=== Diplomats ===
==== Early period ====
- Marquess Komura Jutarō: Boxer Protocol and the Treaty of Portsmouth
- Count Mutsu Munemitsu: Treaty of Shimonoseki
- Count Hayashi Tadasu: Anglo-Japanese Alliance
- Count Kaneko Kentarō: envoy to the United States
- Viscount Aoki Shūzō: Foreign Minister of Japan, Anglo-Japanese Treaty of Commerce and Navigation
- Viscount Torii Tadafumi: Vice Consul to the Kingdom of Hawaii
- Viscount Ishii Kikujiro: Lansing–Ishii Agreement

==== World War II ====
- Shigenori Tōgō: Served as Foreign Minister twice, including during the outbreak of war and the final negotiations for surrender
- Mamoru Shigemitsu: Foreign Minister of Japan who signed the Instrument of Surrender of Japan on behalf of Japan on 2 September 1945.
- Yōsuke Matsuoka: Foreign Minister who signed the Tripartite Pact with Germany and Italy, and the Soviet–Japanese Neutrality Pact
- Baron Hiroshi Ōshima: Japanese ambassador to Nazi Germany
- Chiune Sugihara: Vice-consul in Lithuania who issued thousands of transit visas to Jewish refugees, enabling them to escape the Holocaust in Europe

=== Military ===
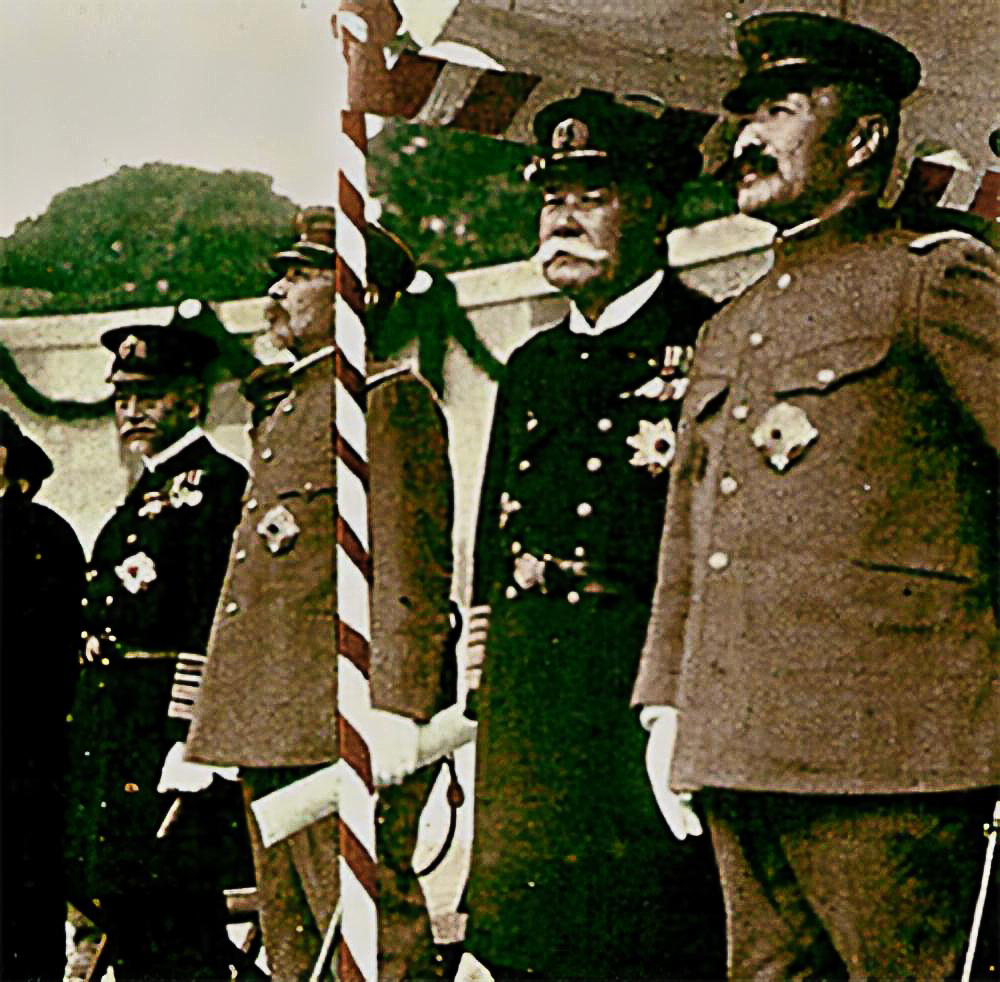
From left to right: Marshal Admiral Heihachirō Tōgō (1848–1934), Field Marshal Oku Yasukata (1847–1930), Marshal Admiral Yoshika Inoue (1845–1929) and Field Marshal Kageaki Kawamura (1850–1926), at the unveiling ceremony of the bronze statue of Field Marshal Iwao Ōyama

The Empire of Japan's military was divided into two main branches: the Imperial Japanese Army and the Imperial Japanese Navy. To coordinate operations, the Imperial General Headquarters, headed by the Emperor, was established in 1893. Prominent generals and leaders:

==== Imperial Japanese Army ====
===== Early period =====
- Field Marshal Prince Yamagata Aritomo: Chief of Staff of the Army, Prime Minister of Japan, Founder of the IJA
- Field Marshal Prince Ōyama Iwao: Chief of Staff of the Army
- Field Marshal Prince Komatsu Akihito: Chief of Staff of the Army
- Field Marshal Marquis Nozu Michitsura:
- General Count Nogi Maresuke: Governor of Taiwan
- General Count Akiyama Yoshifuru: Chief of Staff of the Army
- General Count Kuroki Tamemoto
- General Count Nagaoka Gaishi
- Lieutenant General Baron Ōshima Ken'ichi: Chief of Staff of the Army, Ministry of the Army during World War I
- General Viscount Kodama Gentarō: Chief of Staff of the Army, Governor of Taiwan

===== World War II =====
- Field Marshal Prince Kotohito Kan'in: Chief of Staff of the Army
- Field Marshal Hajime Sugiyama: Chief of Staff of the Army
- General Senjūrō Hayashi: Chief of Staff of the Army, Prime Minister of Japan
- General Hideki Tōjō: Prime Minister of Japan
- General Yoshijirō Umezu: Chief of Staff of the Army

==== Imperial Japanese Navy ====
===== Early period =====
- Marshal Admiral Prince Higashifushimi Yorihito (1867–1922)
- Marshal Admiral Marquess Tōgō Heihachirō (1847–1934), Russo-Japanese war (Battle of Tsushima)
- Marshal Admiral Count Itō Sukeyuki (1843–1914)
- Admiral Count Kawamura Sumiyoshi (1836–1904)
- Marshal Admiral Viscount Inoue Yoshika (1845–1929)
- Marshal Admiral Baron Ijuin Gorō (1852–1921)
- Marshal Admiral Baron Katō Tomosaburō (1861–1923)
- Admiral Baron Akamatsu Noriyoshi (1841–1920)
- Vice Admiral Akiyama Saneyuki (1868–1918), Battle of Tsushima

===== World War II =====
- Marshal Admiral Mineichi Koga (1885–1944)
- Marshal Admiral Isoroku Yamamoto (1884–1943), attack on Pearl Harbor, Battle of Midway
- Marshal Admiral Osami Nagano (1880–1947)
- Admiral Chūichi Nagumo (1887–1944), attack on Pearl Harbor, Battle of Midway
- Rear Admiral Viscount Morio Matsudaira (1878–1944)

== Demographics ==
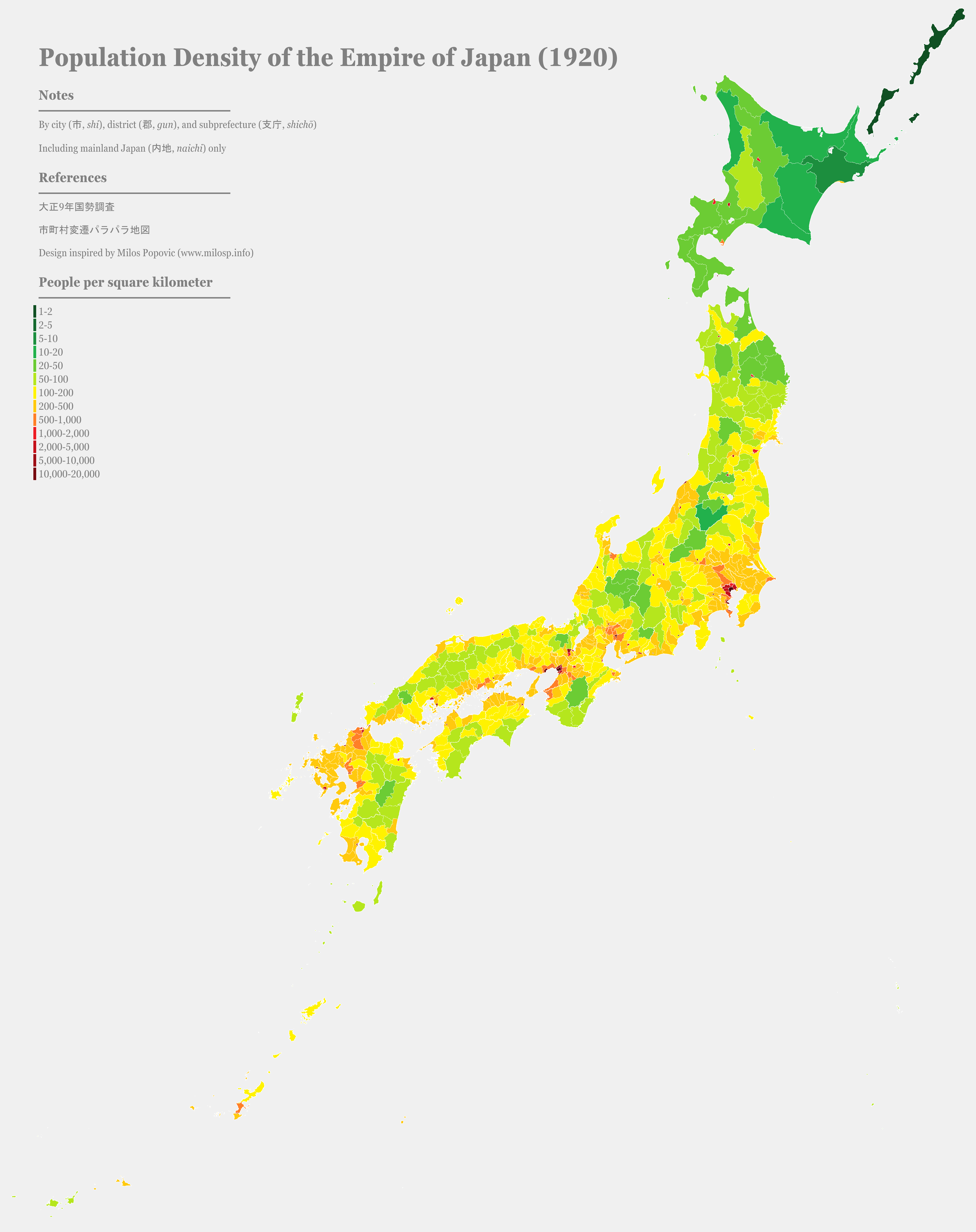
Population density map of the naichi of the Empire of Japan (1920)

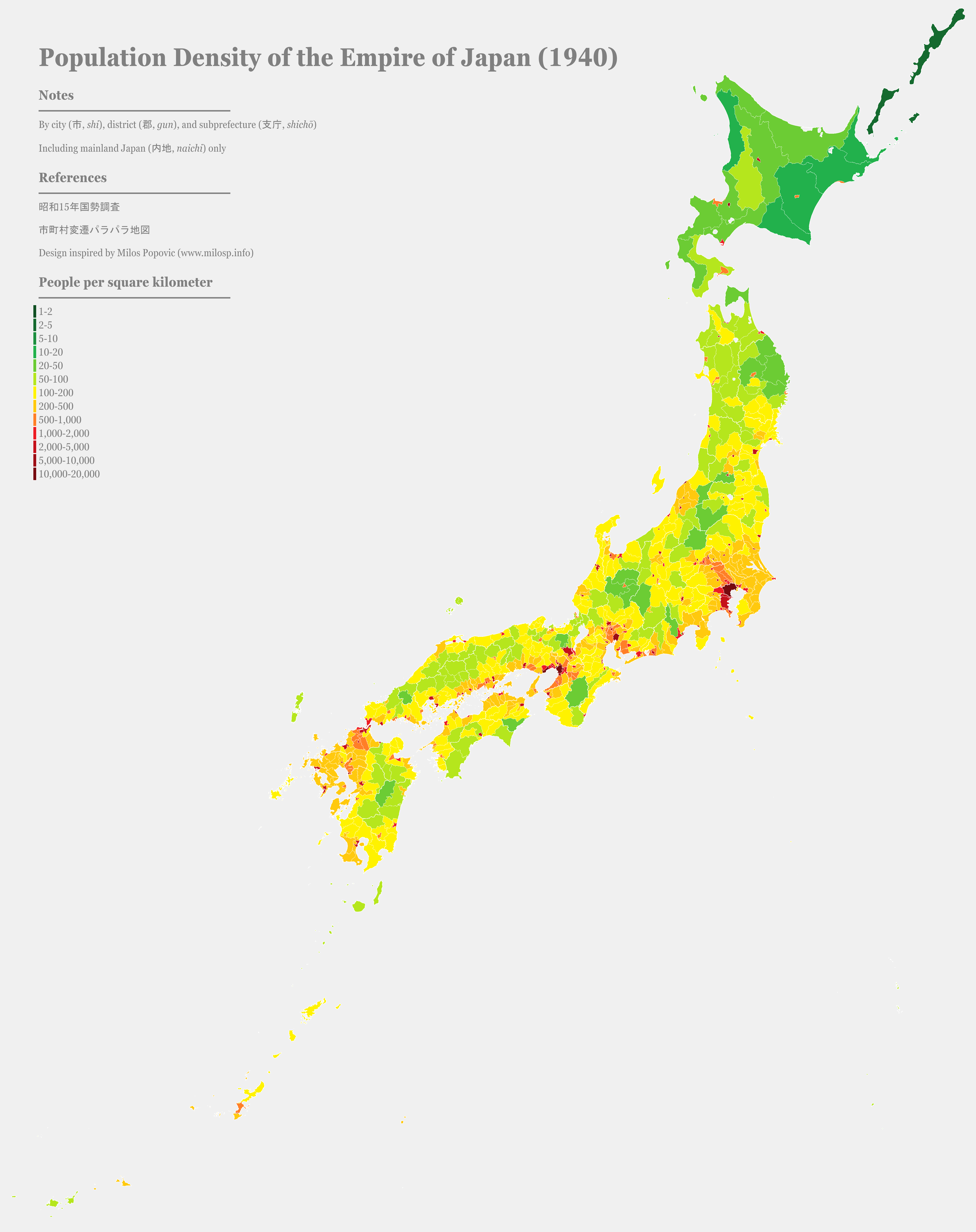
Population density map of the naichi of the Empire of Japan (1940)

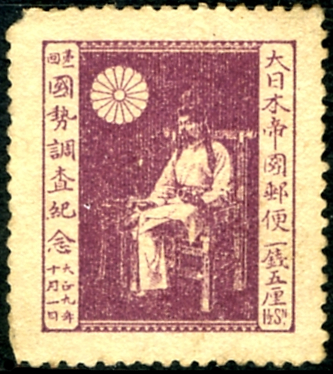
1920 Commemorative stamp for 1st national census of the Empire of Japan

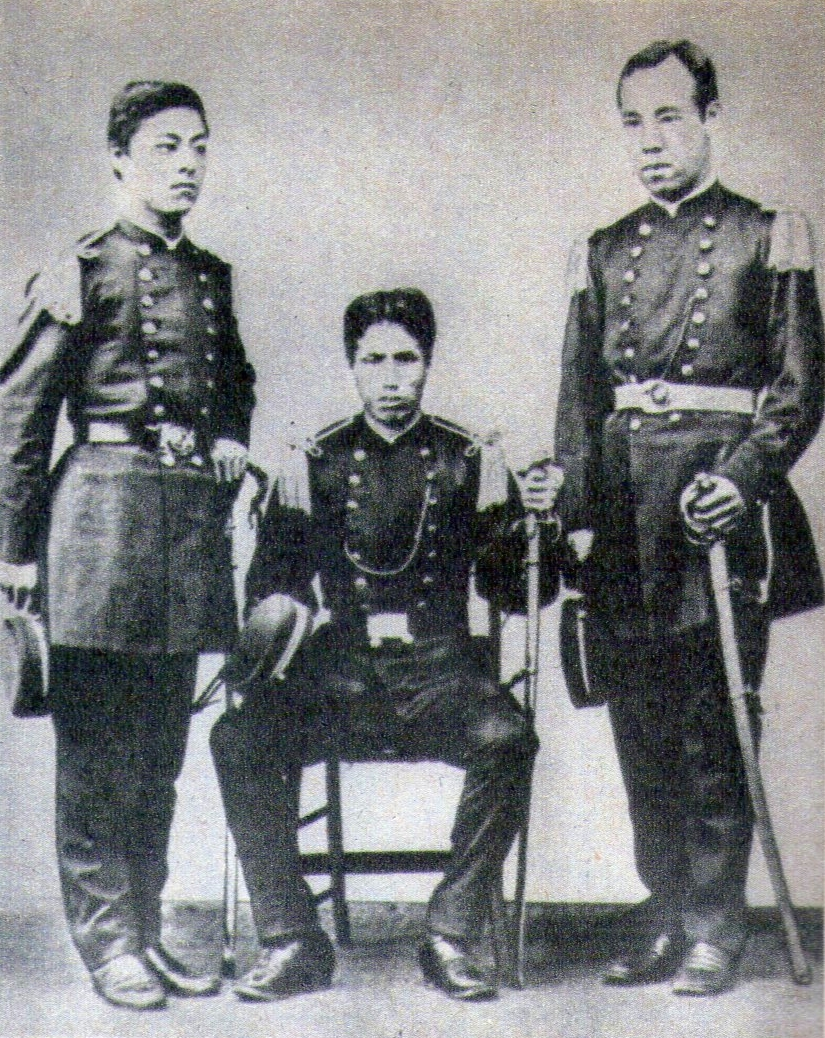
Japanese policemen circa 1875

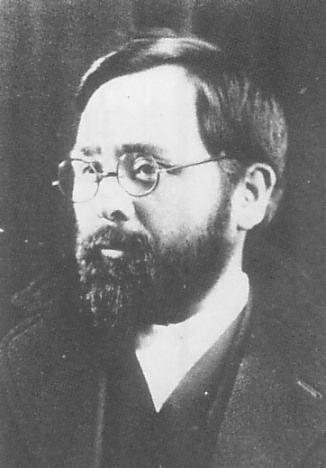
Jiichiro Matsumoto, a Japanese politician, leader of the Burakumin liberation movement

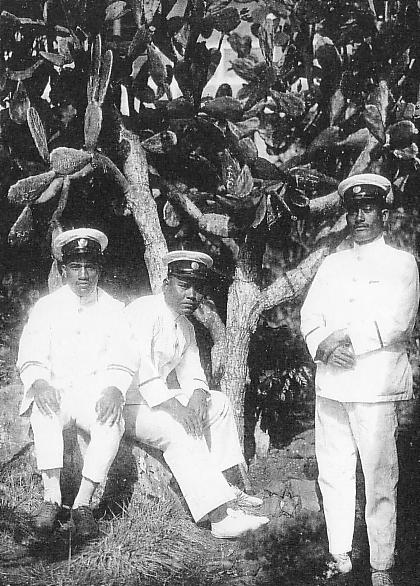
Native Micronesian constables of Truk Island, circa 1930

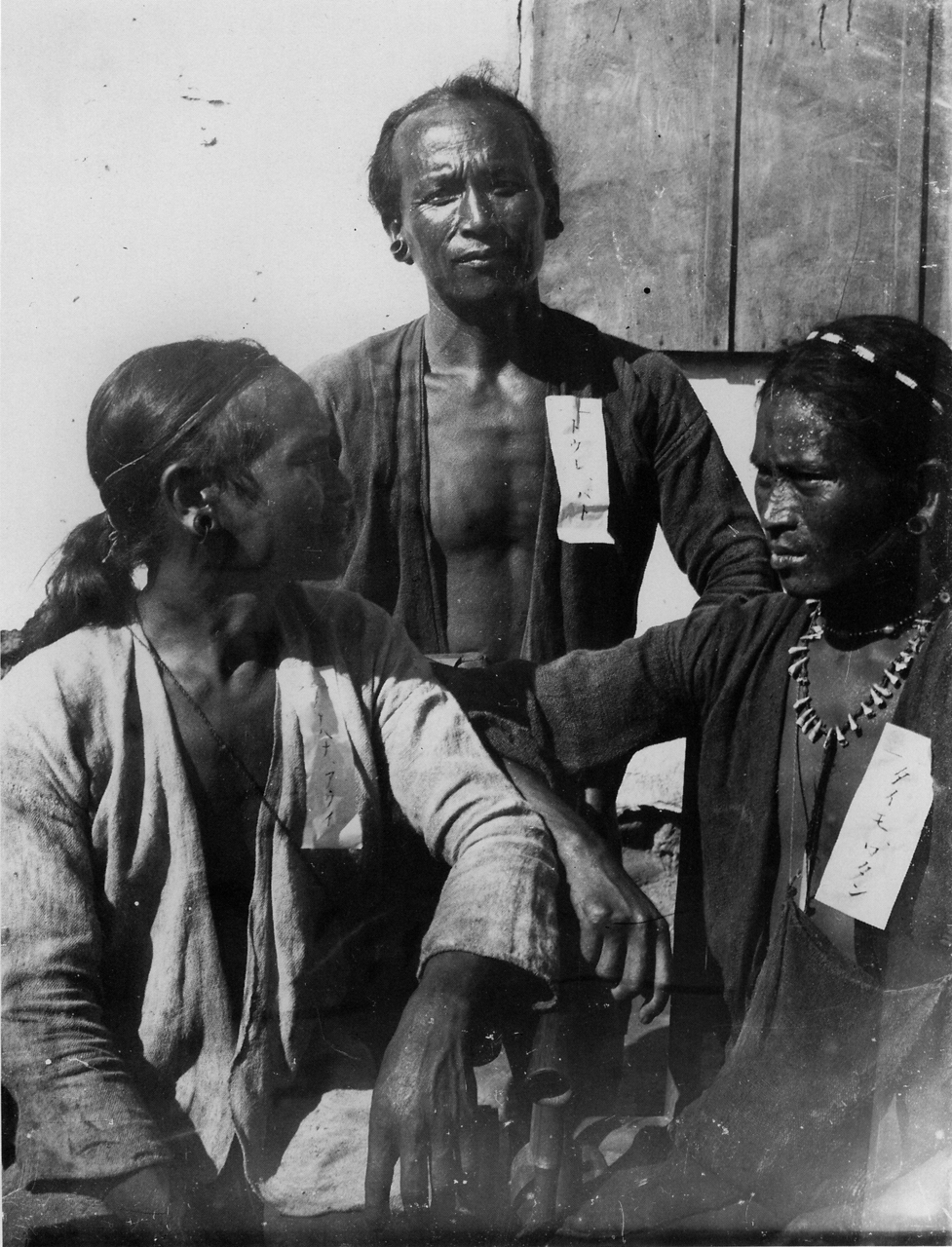
Photograph of Atayal men in 1900

The population of Japan at the time of the Meiji Restoration was estimated to be 34,985,000 on January 1, 1873, while the official original family registries (本籍, honseki) and de facto (or present registries (現住, genjū)) populations on the same day were 33,300,644 and 33,416,939, respectively. These were comparable to the population of the United Kingdom (31,000,000), France (38,000,000), and Austria-Hungary (38,000,000).

== Economy ==
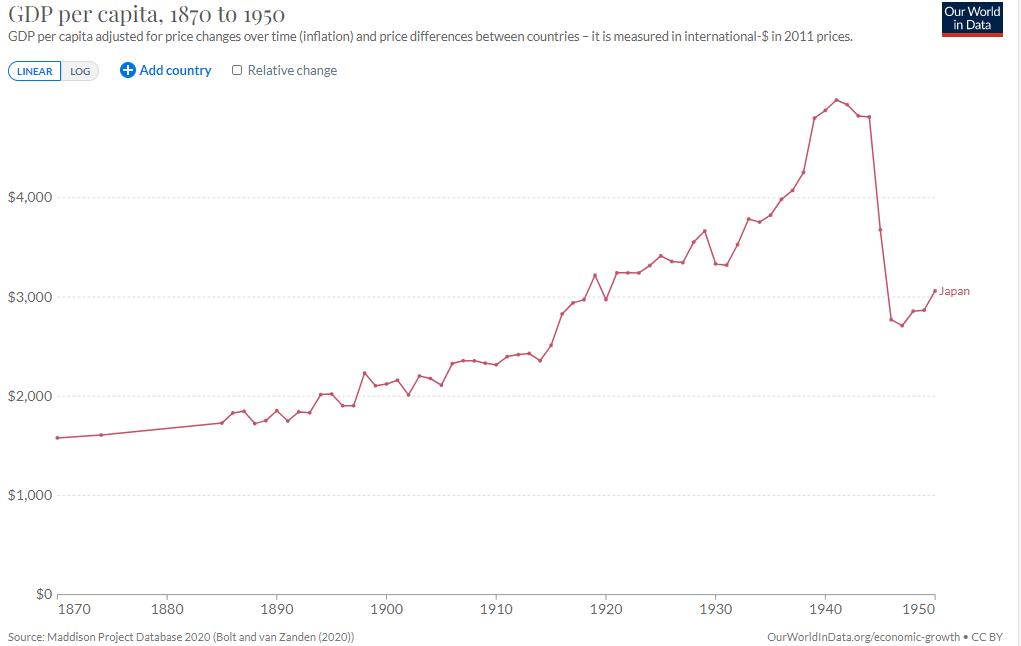
GDP per capita of Japan from 1870 to 1950

The economy of the Empire of Japan refers to the period in Japanese economic history in Imperial Japan that began with the Meiji Restoration in 1868 and ended with the Surrender of Japan in 1945 at the end of World War II. It was characterized by a period of rapid industrialization in the late nineteenth and early twentieth centuries, and the dominance of a wartime economy from 1938 to 1945.

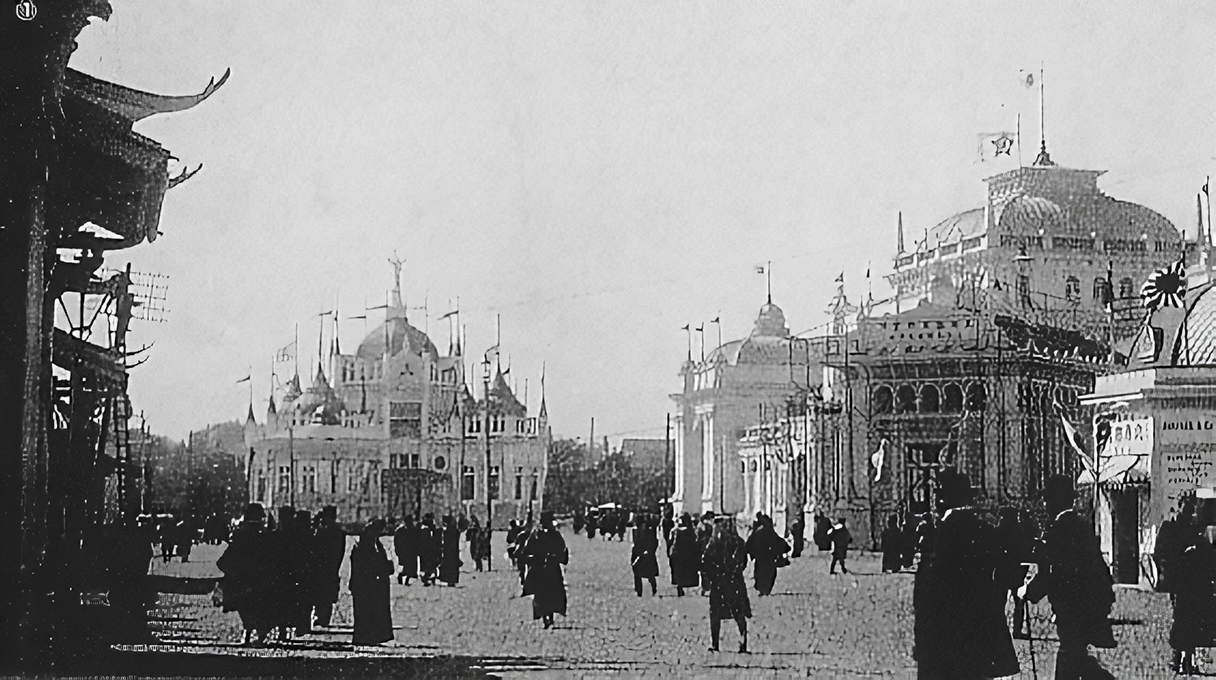
Tokyo Industrial Exhibition, 1907

== Education ==
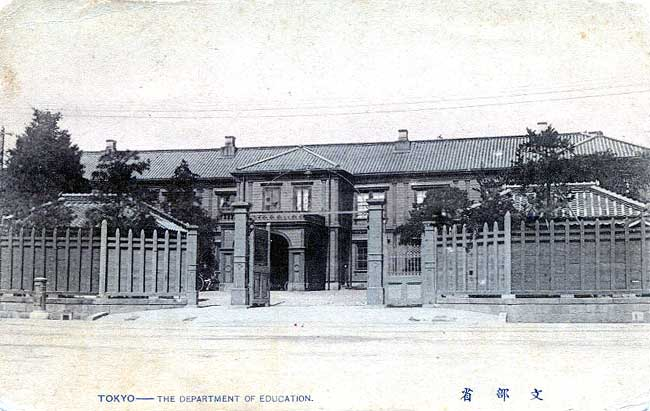
Ministry of Education of Japan, circa 1890

Education in the Empire of Japan was a high priority for its government, as the leadership of the early Meiji government realized the need for universal public education in its drive to modernize the nation.

== Racial policy ==
During World War II, Japan's racial policy was rooted in the concept of Japanese supremacy as the "Yamato race" (Yamato-minzoku), positioning itself as the leader of Asia, while promoting an "Asia for the Asians" propaganda aimed at ending Western colonialism in Asia. This policy, officially under the Greater East Asia Co-Prosperity Sphere, was heavily utilized to justify military expansion.

A 1943 government document (An Investigation of Global Policy with the Yamato Race as Nucleus) defined Japan as the "nucleus" and superior leader of the Asian continent that ensured other nations were under its protection but essentially subordinates.

=== War crimes ===
Imperial Japan committed widespread war crimes during the Second Sino-Japanese War and World War II, involving the deaths of millions through massacres, torture, forced labor, forced prostitution of women and human experimentation. Key atrocities included the Nanjing Massacre, the use of chemical/biological weapons by Unit 731, and the abuse of POWs, with many perpetrators later receiving immunity from the United States.

== Propaganda ==
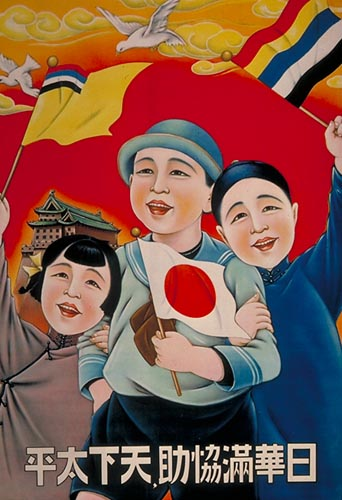
Poster of Manchukuo promoting harmony between Japanese, Han Chinese, and Manchu. The caption says: "With the help of Japan, China, and Manchukuo, the world can be at peace." The flags shown are, left to right: the flag of Manchukuo; the flag of Japan; the "Five Races Under One Union" flag, a flag of China at the time.

Japanese propaganda in the period just before and during World War II was designed to assist the governing regime. Many of its elements were continuous with pre-war themes of Shōwa statism, including the principles of kokutai, hakkō ichiu, and bushido. New forms of propaganda were developed to persuade occupied countries of the benefits of the Greater East Asia Co-Prosperity Sphere, to undermine American troops' morale, to counteract claims of Japanese atrocities, and to present the war to the Japanese people as victorious. It started with the Second Sino-Japanese War, which merged into World War II. It used a large variety of media to send its messages.

== Censorship ==
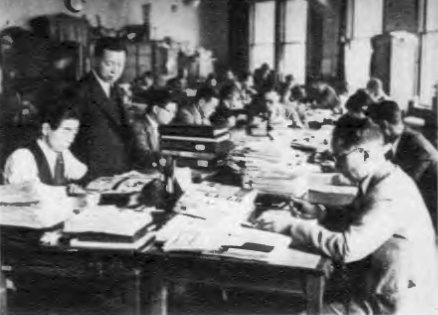
Government censors at work at the Tokyo Metropolitan Police Department in 1938

Censorship (検閲, Ken'etsu) in the Empire of Japan was a continuation of a long tradition beginning in the feudal period of Japan. Government censorship of the press existed in Japan during the Edo period, as the Tokugawa bakufu was in many ways a police state, which sought to control the spread of information, including Christianity, the influx of Western ideas, pornography and any political writings critical of the shōgun and government.

== Society ==
=== Religion ===
Religion in the Empire of Japan was characterized by the establishment of State Shinto, whereby the government used indigenous beliefs to promote imperial divinity and nationalism. While freedom of religion was technically recognized, Shinto was elevated to a non-religious, patriotic obligation.

Although there was a strong anti-Buddhist movement (haibutsu kishaku) that occurred during the enforced separation of Buddhism and Shinto (shinbutsu bunri) which led to the destruction of many Buddhist temples during the Meiji era, major Buddhist institutions, including the Japanese Zen and Nichiren Buddhism sects would subsequently overwhelmingly support militarism and wartime aggression. According to Brian Daizen Victoria's book Zen at War, Japanese Buddhist institutions and masters had contributed significantly to the country's militarism and imperialism from the Meiji Restoration through World War II.

== Notable scholars/scientists ==
=== 19th century ===
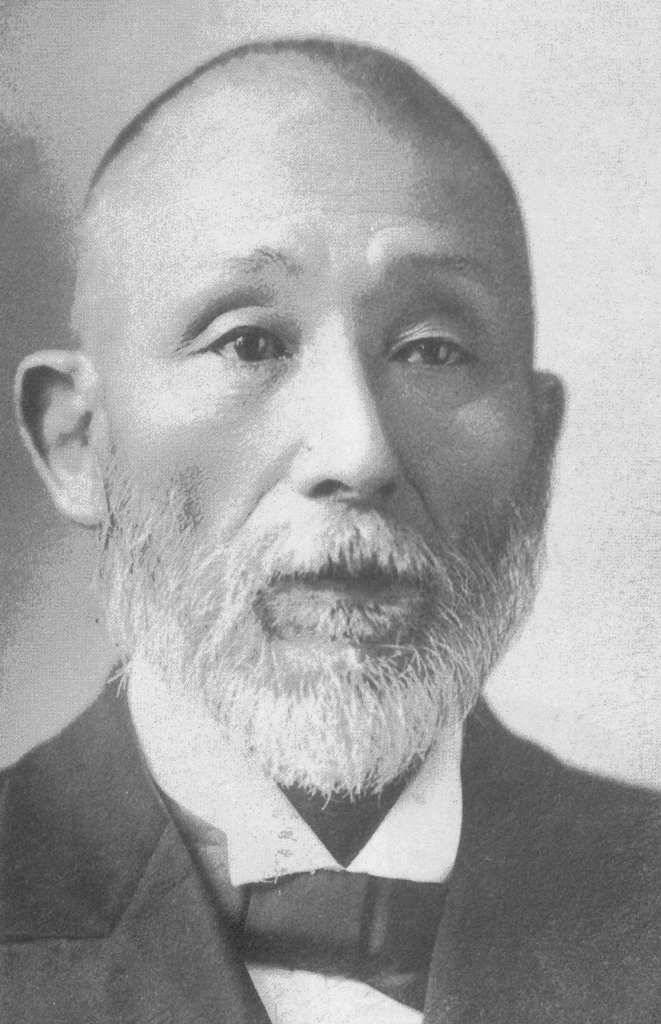
Hirase Sakugorō (1856–1925) was a botanist, who won the Imperial Prize in 1912.

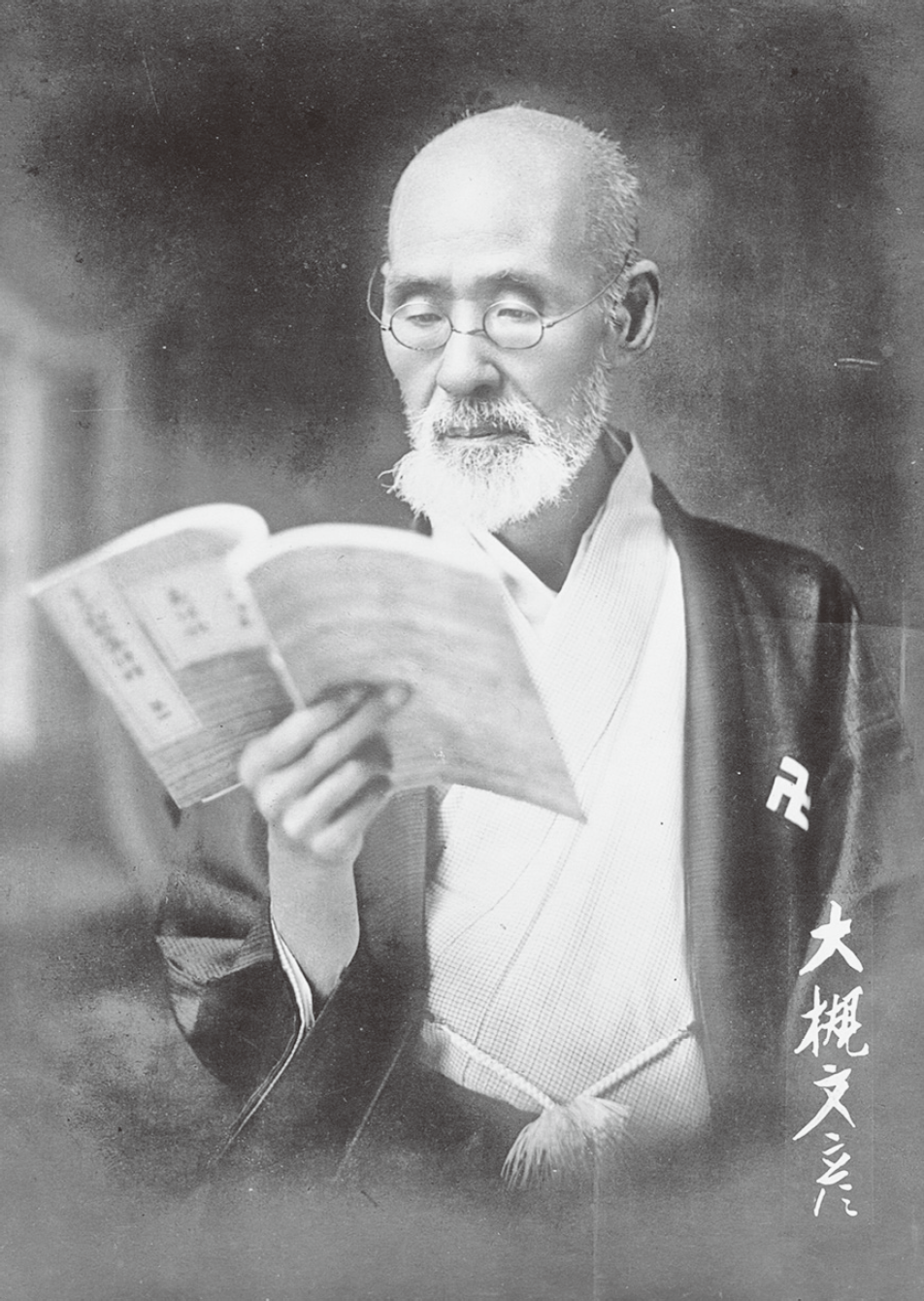
Ōtsuki Fumihiko (1847–1928), editor of two well-known Japanese-language dictionaries, Genkai (言海, "sea of words", 1891) and its successor Daigenkai (大言海, "great sea of words", 1932–1937)

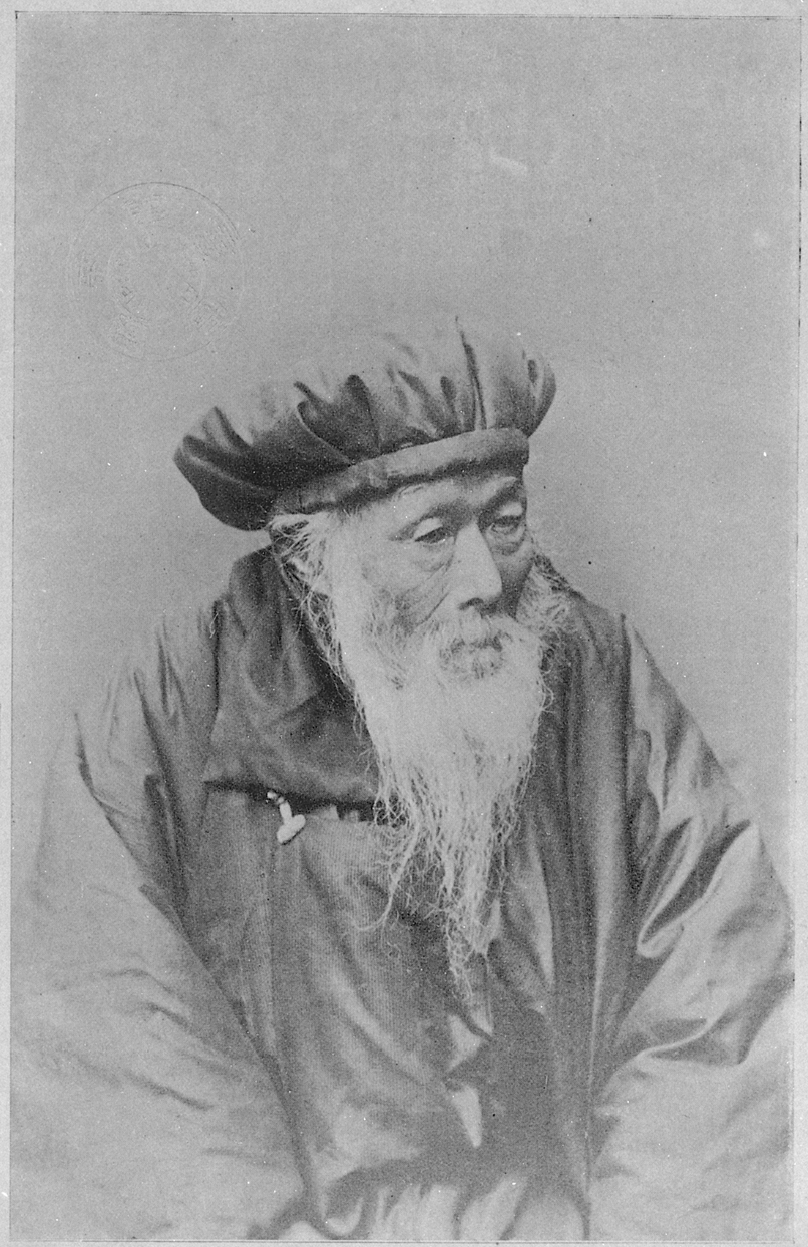
Baron Keisuke Ito (1803–1901) was a biologist and a professor at the Imperial University in Tokyo (University of Tokyo).

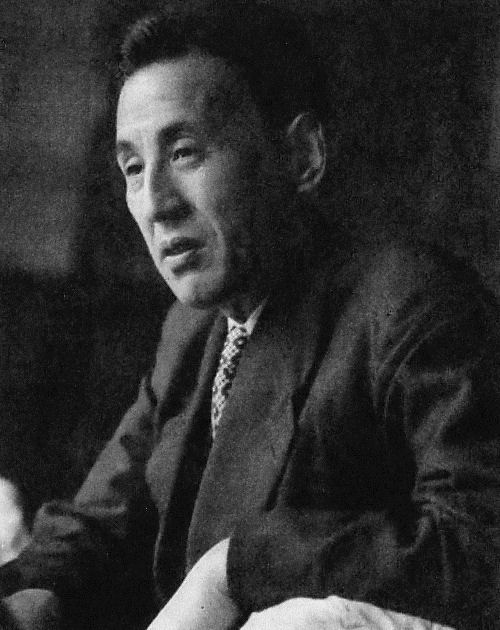
Kiyoo Wadati (1902–1995) was a seismologist, who won the Imperial Prize in 1932.

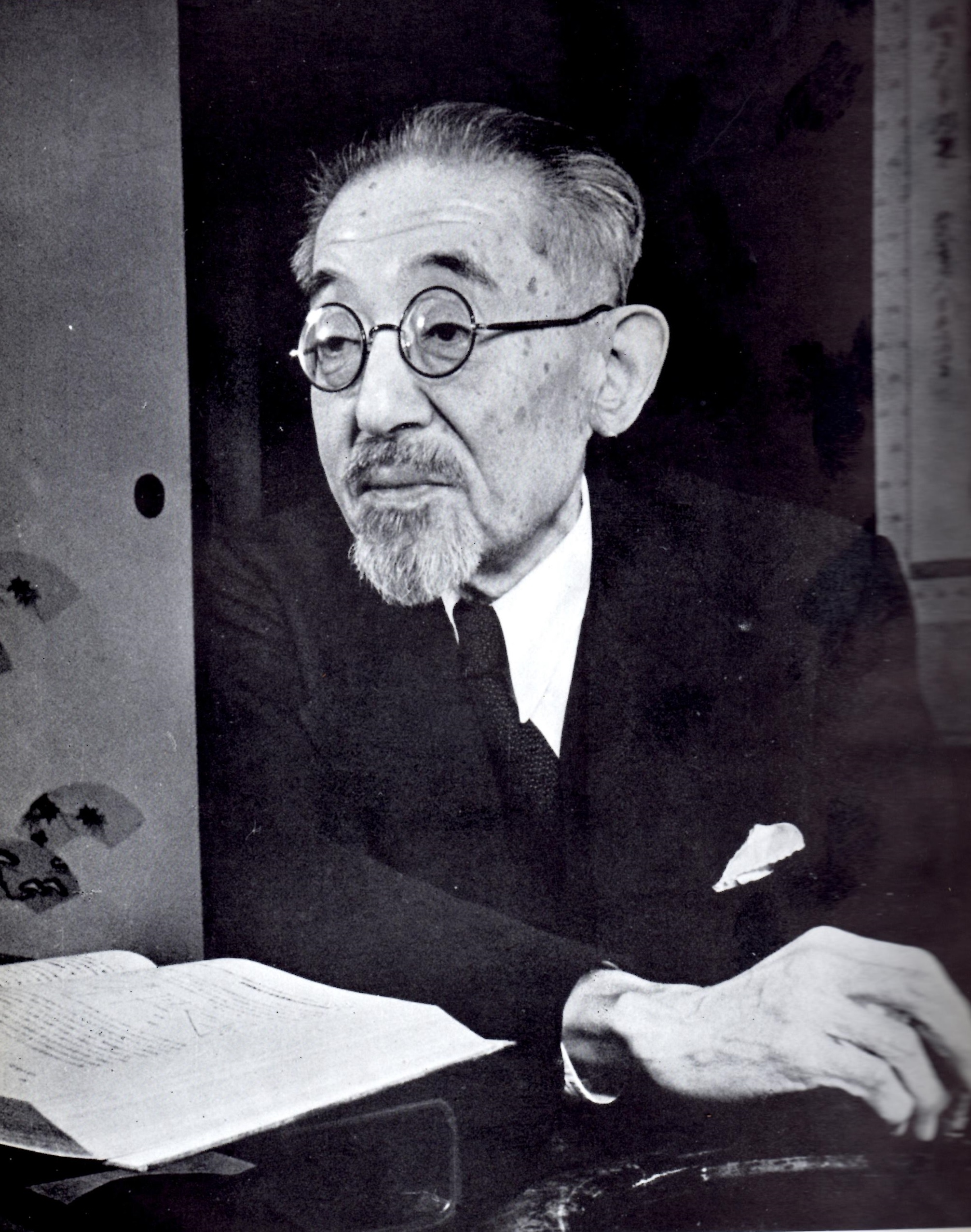
Teiji Takagi (1875–1960) was a mathematician who made seminal contributions to class field theory, and a member of the selection committee for the first Fields Medal.

==== Anthropologists, ethnologists, archaeologists, and historians ====
- Ōtsuki Fumihiko (1847–1928)
- Yusuke Hashiba (1851–1921)
- Koganei Yoshikiyo (1859–1944)
- Naitō Torajirō (1866–1934)
- Inō Kanori (1867–1925)
- Torii Ryūzō (1870–1953)
- Fujioka Katsuji (1872–1935)
- Masaharu Anesaki (1873–1949)
- Kunio Yanagita (1875–1962)
- Ushinosuke Mori (1877–1926)
- Ryūsaku Tsunoda (1877–1964)
- Kōsaku Hamada (1881–1938)
- Kyōsuke Kindaichi (1882–1971)
- Tetsuji Morohashi (1883–1982)
- Tsuruko Haraguchi (1886–1915)
- Shinobu Orikuchi (1887–1953)
- Zenchū Nakahara (1890–1964)

==== Medical scientists, biologists, evolutionary theorists, and geneticists ====
- Keisuke Ito (1803–1901)
- Kusumoto Ine (1827–1903)
- Nagayo Sensai (1838–1902)
- Tanaka Yoshio (1838–1916)
- Nagai Nagayoshi (1844–1929)
- Miyake Hiizu (1848–1938)
- Takaki Kanehiro (1849–1920)
- Kitasato Shibasaburō (1853–1931)
- Hirase Sakugorō (1856–1925)
- Jinzō Matsumura (1856–1928)
- Juntaro takahashi (1856–1920)
- Aoyama Tanemichi (1859–1917)
- Yoichirō Hirase (1859–1925)
- Ishikawa Chiyomatsu (1861–1935)
- Tomitaro Makino (1862–1957)
- Yamagiwa Katsusaburō (1863–1930)
- Yu Fujikawa (1865–1940)
- Fujiro Katsurada (1867–1946)
- Kamakichi Kishinouye (1867–1929)
- Yasuyoshi Shirasawa (1868–1947)
- Takuji Iwasaki (1869–1937)
- Kiyoshi Shiga (1871–1957)
- Heijiro Nakayama (1871–1956)
- Sunao Tawara (1873–1952)
- Bunzō Hayata (1874–1934)
- Ryukichi Inada (1874–1950)
- Kensuke Mitsuda (1876–1964)
- Hideyo Noguchi (1876–1928)
- Fukushi Masaichi (1878–1956)
- Takaoki Sasaki (1878–1966)
- Gennosuke Fuse (1880–1946)
- Kono Yasui (1880–1971)
- Hakaru Hashimoto (1881–1934)
- Ichiro Miyake (1881–1964)
- Kunihiko Hashida (1882–1945)
- Takenoshin Nakai (1882–1952)
- Kyusaku Ogino (1882–1975)
- Gen-ichi Koidzumi (1883–1953)
- Makoto Nishimura (1883–1956)
- Shintarō Hirase (1884–1939)
- Tamezo Mori (1884–1962)
- Kanesuke Hara (1885–1962)
- Chōzaburō Tanaka (1885–1976)
- Michiyo Tsujimura (1888–1969)
- Yaichirō Okada (1892–1976)
- Ikuro Takahashi (1892–1981)
- Hitoshi Kihara (1893–1986)
- Satyu Yamaguti (1894–1976)
- Kinichiro Sakaguchi (1897–1994)
- Minoru Shirota (1899–1982)
- Genkei Masamune (1899–1993)

==== Inventors, industrialists, engineers ====
- Tanaka Hisashige (1799–1881)
- Ōshima Takatō (1826–1901)
- Yamao Yōzō (1837–1917)
- Murata Tsuneyoshi (1838–1921)
- Masuda Takashi (1848–1938)
- Sasō Sachū (1852–1905)
- Arisaka Nariakira (1852–1915)
- Furuichi Kōi (1854–1934)
- Hirai Seijirō (1856–1926)
- Dan Takuma (1858–1932)
- Mikimoto Kōkichi (1858–1954)
- Shimose Masachika (1860–1911)
- Kotaro Shimomura (1861–1937)
- Chūhachi Ninomiya (1866–1936)
- Sakichi Toyoda (1867–1930)
- Kijirō Nambu (1869–1949)
- Namihei Odaira (1874–1951)
- Jujiro Matsuda (1875–1952)
- Masuda Tarokaja (1875–1953)
- Ryōichi Yazu (1878–1908)
- Yoshisuke Aikawa (1880–1967)
- Noritsugu Hayakawa (1881–1942)
- Miekichi Suzuki (1882–1936)
- Chikuhei Nakajima (1884–1949)
- Hidetsugu Yagi (1886–1976)
- Michio Suzuki (1887–1982)
- Yasujiro Niwa (1893–1975)
- Tokuji Hayakawa (1893–1980)
- Kōnosuke Matsushita (1894–1989)
- Kinjiro Okabe (1896–1984)
- Toshiwo Doko (1896–1988)
- Kenjiro Takayanagi (1899–1990)

==== Philosophers, educators, mathematicians, and polymaths ====
- Inoue Enryō (1799–1881)
- Nishimura Shigeki (1828–1902)
- Nishi Amane (1829–1897)
- Kikuchi Dairoku (1855–1917)
- Hōjō Tokiyuki (1858–1929)
- Rikitaro Fujisawa (1861–1933)
- Mitsutaro Shirai (1863–1932)
- Nitobe Inazō (1862–1933)
- Paul Tsuchihashi (1866–1965)
- Kintarô Okamura (1867–1935)
- Totsudō Katō (1870–1949)
- Tsuruichi Hayashi (1873–1935)
- Yoshio Mikami (1875–1950)
- Teiji Takagi (1875–1960)
- Matsusaburo Fujiwara (1881–1946)
- Yoshishige Abe (1883–1966)
- Sōichi Kakeya (1886–1947)

==== Chemists, physicists, and geologists ====
- Jōkichi Takamine (1854–1922)
- Yamakawa Kenjirō (1854–1931)
- Sekiya Seikei (1855–1896)
- Tanakadate Aikitsu (1856–1952)
- Kikunae Ikeda (1864–1936)
- Masataka Ogawa (1865–1930)
- Hantaro Nagaoka (1865–1950)
- Fusakichi Omori (1868–1923)
- Shin Hirayama (1868–1945)
- Hisashi Kimura (1870–1943)
- Akitsune Imamura (1870–1948)
- Kotaro Honda (1870–1954)
- Harutaro Murakami (1872–1947)
- Shinzo Shinjo (1873–1938)
- Umetaro Suzuki (1874–1943)
- Kiyotsugu Hirayama (1874–1943)
- Suekichi Kinoshita (1877–1935)
- Torahiko Terada (1878–1935)
- Masatoshi Ōkōchi (1878–1952)
- Keiichi Aichi (1880–1923)
- Jun Ishiwara (1881–1947)
- Yasuhiko Asahina (1881–1975)
- Satoyasu Iimori (1885–1982)
- Akira Ogata (1887–1978)
- Yoshio Nishina (1890–1951)
- Tokushichi Mishima (1893–1975)
- Masuzo Shikata (1895–1964)
- Hakaru Masumoto (1895–1987)
- Okuro Oikawa (1896–1970)
- Ozawa Yoshiaki (1899–1929)

=== 20th century ===
- Mako
- Yoji Ito
- Satosi Watanabe
- Seiji Naruse
- Takeo Doi
- Tatsuo Hasegawa
- Kiro Honjo
- Jiro Horikoshi
- Hideo Itokawa
- Soichiro Honda
- Yanosuke Hirai
- Katsuji Miyazaki
- Shinroku Momose
- Ryoichi Nakagawa
- Jiro Tanaka
- Noriaki Fukuyama
- Eizaburo Nishibori
- Shin'ichirō Tomonaga
- Kiyoo Wadati
- Shokichi Iyanaga
- Hideki Yukawa
- Takeo Hatanaka
- Kazuo Kubokawa
- Tomizo Yoshida
- Kiyosi Itô
- Shoichi Sakata
- Yutaka Taniyama
- Kôdi Husimi
- Seishi Kikuchi
- Taketani Mitsuo
- Takahiko Yamanouchi
- Shigeyoshi Matsumae
- Shigeo Shingo
- Nobuchika Sugimura
- Jisaburo Ohwi
- Yo Takenaka
- Sanshi Imai
- Kikutaro Baba
- Katsuzo Kuronuma
- Yasunori Miyoshi
- Katsuma Dan
- Hiroshi Nakamura
- Ukichiro Nakaya
- Yusuke Hagihara
- Isao Imai
- Shintaro Uda
- Kinjiro Okabe
- Ozawa Yoshiaki
- Issaku Koga
- Yuzuru Hiraga
- Jiro Horikoshi
- Yoshiro Okabe
- Motonori Matuyama
- Masauji Hachisuka
- Tokubei Kuroda
- Hikosaka Tadayoshi
- Bunsaku Arakatsu
- Shinji Maejima
- Takahito, Prince Mikasa
- Toshihiko Izutsu
- Kawachi Yoshihiro
- Katsutada Sezawa
- Katsura Kotaro

== Timeline (1926–1947) ==
- 1926: Emperor Taishō dies (December 25).
- 1927: Tanaka Giichi becomes prime minister (April 20).
- 1928: Emperor Shōwa is formally installed as emperor (November 10).
- 1929: Osachi Hamaguchi becomes prime minister (July 2).
- 1930: Hamaguchi is wounded in an assassination attempt (November 14).
- 1931: Hamaguchi dies and Wakatsuki Reijirō becomes prime minister (April 14). Japan occupies Manchuria after the Mukden Incident (September 18). Inukai Tsuyoshi becomes prime minister (December 13) and increases funding for the military in China.
- 1932: After an attack on Japanese monks in Shanghai (January 18), Japanese forces shell the city (January 29). Manchukuo is established with Henry Pu Yi as emperor (February 29). Inukai is assassinated during a coup attempt and Saitō Makoto becomes prime minister (May 15). Japan is censured by the League of Nations (December 7).
- 1933: Japan leaves the League of Nations (March 27).
- 1934: Keisuke Okada becomes prime minister (July 8). Japan withdraws from the Washington Naval Treaty (December 29).
- 1936: Coup attempt (February 26 Incident). Kōki Hirota becomes prime minister (March 9). Japan signs its first pact with Germany (November 25) and reoccupies Tsingtao (December 3). Mengjiang established in Inner Mongolia.
- 1937: Senjūrō Hayashi becomes prime minister (February 2). Prince Fumimaro Konoe becomes prime minister (June 4). Battle of Lugou Bridge (July 7). Japan captures Beijing (July 31). Japanese troops occupy Nanjing (December 13), beginning the Nanjing Massacre.
- 1938: Battle of Taierzhuang (March 24). Canton falls to Japanese forces (October 21).
- 1939: Hiranuma Kiichirō becomes prime minister (January 5). Japan annexes the Spratly Islands (March 30). Abe Nobuyuki becomes prime minister (August 30).
- 1940: Mitsumasa Yonai becomes prime minister (January 16). Konoe becomes prime minister for a second term (July 22). Hundred Regiments Offensive (August–September). Japan occupies French Indochina in the wake of the fall of Paris, and signs the Tripartite Pact (September 27).
- 1941: General Hideki Tojo becomes prime minister (October 18). Japanese naval forces attack Pearl Harbor, Hawaii (December 7), prompting the United States to declare war on Japan (December 8). Japan conquers Hong Kong (December 25). Japan annexes the Paracel Islands in 1941.
- 1942: Battle of Ambon (January 30 – February 3). Battle of Palembang (February 13–15). Singapore surrenders to Japan (February 15). Japan bombs Australia (February 19). Indian Ocean raid (March 31 – April 10). Doolittle Raid on Tokyo (April 18). Battle of the Coral Sea (May 4–8). U.S. and Filipino forces in the Battle of the Philippines (1942) surrender (May 8). Allied victory at the Battle of Midway (June 6). Allied victory in the Battle of Milne Bay (September 5). Battle of the Santa Cruz Islands (October 25–27).
- 1943: Allied victory in the Battle of Guadalcanal (February 9). Allied victory at the Battle of Tarawa (November 23).
- 1944: Tojo resigns and Kuniaki Koiso becomes prime minister (July 22). Battle of Leyte Gulf (October 23–26).
- 1945: Allied bombers begin firebombing of major Japanese cities. Allied victory at the Battle of Iwo Jima (March 26). Admiral Kantarō Suzuki becomes prime minister (April 7). Allied victory at the Battle of Okinawa (June 21). The US drops atomic bombs on Hiroshima (August 6) and Nagasaki (August 9), the Soviet Union and Mongolia invade Manchukuo, Chinese Mengjiang (Inner Mongolia), and Japan (northern Korea, South Sakhalin and the Kuril Islands) (August 9 – September 2). Japan surrenders (September 2): Allied occupation begins.
- 1947: The Constitution of Japan comes into force.

== Emblems ==
Flag of the Civilian Government

Flag of The Empire of Japan and the War flag of the Imperial Japanese Army

Naval ensign of the Empire of Japan

Flag of the Japanese Emperor

== See also ==
- Agriculture in the Empire of Japan
- Axis powers negotiations on the division of Asia
- Collaboration with the Empire of Japan
- Emperor system
- Foreign commerce and shipping of the Empire of Japan
- Germany–Japan industrial co-operation before World War II
- Honorary Aryan
- Industrial production in Shōwa Japan
- Japan and the Holocaust
- Jewish settlement in the Empire of Japan
- Japanese colonial empire
- Japanese history textbook controversies
- Japanese nuclear weapon program
- List of territories occupied by Imperial Japan
- Political dissidence in the Empire of Japan
- Political extremism in Japan
- Political parties of the Empire of Japan
- Political prisoners in Imperial Japan
- Political repression in Imperial Japan
- Socialism in the Empire of Japan

== Notes ==
Preceded by Edo period 1603−1868	History of Japan; Empire of Japan; 1868−1947	Succeeded by Post-war Japan; 1945–present Occupation of Japan; 1945–1952
