= List of Japanese inventions and discoveries =

This is a list of Japanese inventions and discoveries. The Japanese have made contributions across a number of scientific, technological and art domains. In particular, the country has played a crucial role in the digital revolution since the 20th century, with many modern revolutionary and widespread technologies in fields such as electronics and robotics introduced by Japanese inventors and entrepreneurs.

== Arts ==
Comic book
Adam L. Kern has suggested that kibyoshi, picture books from the late 18th century, may have been the world's first comic books. These graphical narratives share with modern manga humorous, satirical, and romantic themes. Some works were mass-produced as serials using woodblock printing.

Folding hand fan
In ancient Japan, the first hand fans were oval and rigid fans, influenced greatly by Chinese fans. The earliest visual depiction of fans in Japan dates back to the 6th century AD, with burial tomb paintings showed drawings of fans. The folding fan was invented in Japan, with dates ranging from the 6th to 9th centuries and later exported to East Asia, Southeast Asia, and the West. Such a flourishing trade involving Japanese hand fans existed in the Ming dynasty times, when folding fans almost absolutely displaced the old rigid type in China.
Kabuki
Kabuki is a classical form of Japanese theatre, mixing dramatic performance with traditional dance.
Manga
The history of manga has origins in scrolls dating back to the 12th century, and it is believed they represent the basis for the right-to-left reading style. During the Edo period (1603–1867), Toba Ehon embedded the concept of manga. The word itself first came into common usage in 1798, with the publication of works such as Santō Kyōden's picturebook Shiji no yukikai (1798), and in the early 19th century with such works as Aikawa Minwa's Manga hyakujo (1814) and the Hokusai Manga books (1814–1834).
Nihonga
Nihonga is a Japanese style of painting that typically uses mineral pigments, and occasionally ink, together with other organic pigments on silk or paper which was popular during Meiji period.
Oil pastel
Oil pastel is a type of pastel that uses mixture of non-drying oil and wax as binder which was developed by Kanae Yamamoto.
Revolving stage
Invented for the Kabuki theatre in Japan in the 18th century, the revolving stage was introduced into Western theater at the Residenz theatre in Munich in 1896 under the influence of japonism fever.
Yōga
It is a style of artistic painting in Japan, typically of Japanese subjects, themes, or landscapes, but using Western (European) artistic conventions, techniques, and materials.

=== Film and animation ===
Anime
Japanese animation, or anime, today widely popular both in Japan and abroad, began in the early 20th century.

Man with No Name
A stock character that originated with Akira Kurosawa's Yojimbo (1961), where the archetype was first portrayed by Toshirō Mifune. The archetype was adapted by Sergio Leone for his Spaghetti Western Dollars Trilogy (1964–1966), with Clint Eastwood playing the role of the "Man with No Name" in Japan. The first depiction of mecha Super Robots being piloted by a user from within a cockpit was introduced in the manga and anime series Mazinger Z by Go Nagai in 1972.

Postcyberpunk animation/film
The first postcyberpunk media work in an animated/film format was Ghost in the Shell: Stand Alone Complex in 2002. It has been called "the most interesting, sustained postcyberpunk media work in existence."
Rashomon effect
It is the phenomenon of the unreliability of eyewitnesses which is named after Akira Kurosawa's 1950 Japanese film Rashomon, which itself is based on Ryunosuke Akutagawa's short story "In a Grove", in which a murder is described in four contradictory ways by four witnesses.
Steampunk animation
The earliest examples of steampunk animation are Hayao Miyazaki's anime works Future Boy Conan (1978), Nausicaä of the Valley of the Wind (1984) and Castle in the Sky (1986).

Superflat
A postmodern art form, founded by the artist Takashi Murakami, which is influenced by manga and anime.

=== Architecture ===
Capsule hotel
The first capsule hotel in the world opened in 1979 and was the Capsule Inn Osaka, located in the Umeda district of Osaka, Japan and designed by Kisho Kurokawa. From there, it spread to other cities within Japan. Since then, the concept has further spread to various other territories, including Belgium, China, Hong Kong, Iceland, India, Indonesia, and Poland.
Japanese castle
Fortresses constructed primarily out of stone and wood used for military defence in strategic locations.

Nagoya Castle

Metabolism
A post-war Japanese architectural movement developed by a wide variety of Japanese architects including Kiyonori Kikutake, Kisho Kurokawa and Fumihiko Maki, Metabolism aimed to fuse ideas about architectural megastructures with those of organic biological growth.

Tahōtō
Tahōtō is a form of Japanese pagoda found primarily at Esoteric Shingon and Tendai school Buddhist temples. Unlike most pagodas, it has two stories.

== Atmospheric sciences ==
Downburst
Downbursts, strong ground-level wind systems that emanate from a point above and blow radially, were discovered by Ted Fujita.

Fujita scale
The first scale designed to measure tornado intensity, the Fujita scale, was first introduced by Ted Fujita (in collaboration with Allen Pearson) in 1971. The scale was widely adopted throughout the world until the development of the Enhanced Fujita scale.

Fujiwhara effect
The Fujiwhara effect is an atmospheric phenomenon where two nearby cyclonic vortices orbit each other and close the distance between the circulations of their corresponding low-pressure areas. The effect was first described by Sakuhei Fujiwhara in 1921.

Jet stream
Jet streams were first discovered by Japanese meteorologist Wasaburo Oishi by tracking ceiling balloons. However, Oishi's work largely went unnoticed outside Japan because it was published in Esperanto.

Microburst
The microburst was first discovered and identified as a small scale downburst affecting an area 4 km (2.5 mi) in diameter or less by Ted Fujita in 1974. Microbursts are recognized as capable of generating wind speeds higher than 270 km/h (170 mph). In addition, Fujita also discovered macrobursts and classified them as downbursts larger than 4 km (2.5 mi).

== Sports ==
Drifting competition
In 1988, Keiichi Tsuchiya alongside Option magazine founder and chief editor Daijiro Inada organised the first contest specifically for sliding a car sideways. In 1996, Option organized the first contest outside Japan which began to spread to other countries.

Ekiden (Road Relay)

Gateball
It was invented by Suzuki Kazunobu in 1947.

Keirin
Started as a gambling sport in 1948 and became an Olympic sport in 2000.

=== Board games ===
Gomoku
It is also called five in a row, is an abstract strategy board game. It is traditionally played with Go pieces (black and white stones) on a 15×15 Go board
Shogi
Shogi is an abstract strategy board game for two players similar to chess which is also called as Japanese chess.
Sugoroku
Sugoroku refers to two different forms of a Japanese board game which is similar to Western snakes and ladders, and ban-sugoroku (盤双六, 'board-sugoroku') which is similar to western tables games like backgammon.

=== Martial arts ===
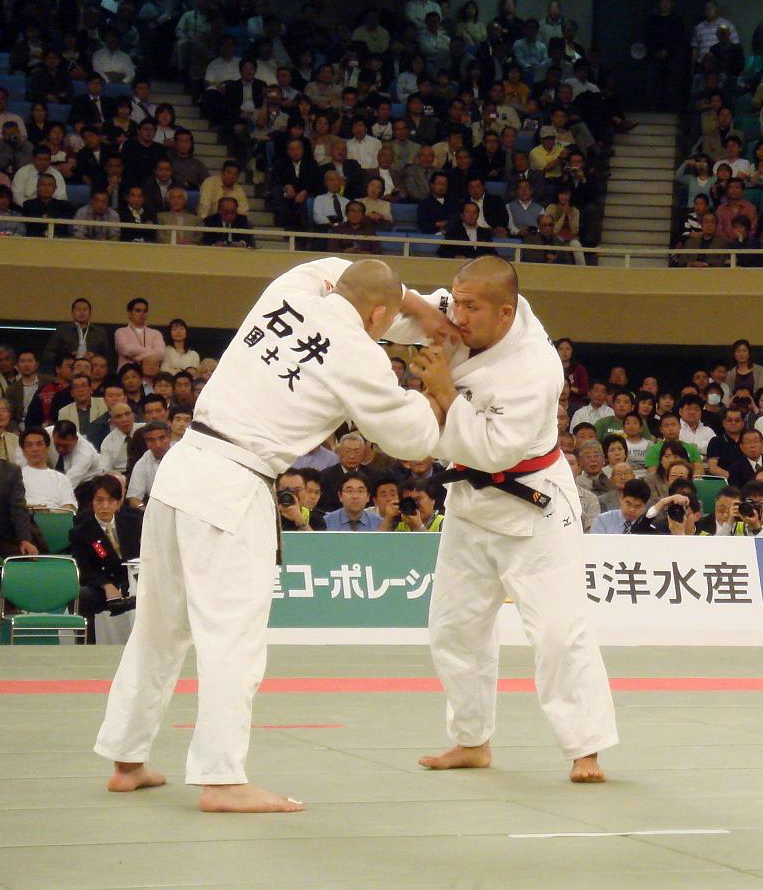
All-Japan Judo Championships, 2007 men's final

Aikido
Aikido was created and developed by Morihei Ueshiba in first half of the 20th century.

Judo
It was created as a physical, mental and moral pedagogy in Japan, in 1882, by Kanō Jigorō.

Jujutsu
Jujutsu, the "way of yielding", is a collective name for Japanese martial art styles including unarmed and armed techniques. Jujutsu evolved among the samurai of feudal Japan as a method for defeating an armed and armored opponent without weapons. Due to the ineffectiveness of striking against an armored opponent, the most efficient methods for neutralizing an enemy took the form of pins, joint locks, and throws. These techniques were developed around the principle of using an attacker's energy against him, rather than directly opposing it.

Karate
It began as a common fighting system known as "ti" (or "te") among the pechin class of the Ryukyuans. There were few formal styles of ti, but rather many practitioners with their own methods. One surviving example is the Motobu-ryū school passed down from the Motobu family by Seikichi Uehara. Early styles of karate are often generalized as Shuri-te, Naha-te, and Tomari-te, named after the three cities from which they emerged.

Kendo
It is a modern Japanese martial art, descended from kenjutsu (one of the old Japanese martial arts, swordsmanship), that uses bamboo swords (shinai) as well as protective armor (bōgu).

Naginatajutsu
Naginatajutsu is the martial art of wielding the naginata (長刀). The naginata is a weapon resembling the European glaive and the Chinese guan dao.
Ninjutsu
Developed by groups of people mainly from the Iga Province and Kōka, Shiga of Japan. Throughout history, many different schools (ryū) have taught their unique versions of ninjutsu. An example of these is the Togakure-ryū. This ryū was developed after a defeated samurai warrior called Daisuke Togakure escaped to the region of Iga. Later he came in contact with the warrior-monk Kain Doshi who taught him a new way of viewing life and the means of survival (ninjutsu).

Okinawan martial arts
In the 14th century, when the three kingdoms on Okinawa (Chūzan, Hokuzan, and Nanzan) entered into a tributary relationship with the Ming dynasty of China, Chinese Imperial envoys and other Chinese arrived, some of whom taught Chinese Chuan Fa (Kempo) to the Okinawans. The Okinawans combined Chinese Chuan Fa with the existing martial art of Te to form Tō-de (唐手, Okinawan: Tū-dī; Tang hand), sometimes called Okinawa-te (沖縄手). By the 18th century, different types of Te had developed in three different villages – Naha, Shuri, and Tomari. The styles were named Naha-te, Shuri-te, and Tomari-te, respectively. Practitioners from these three villages went on to develop modern karate.

Sumo

According to the Nihon shoki, published in 720, the origin of sumo is the contest of strength between Nomi no Sukune and Taima no Kehaya in 26 B.C. Haniwa of sumo wrestlers are made in the Kofun period (300–538). The imperial family often watches sumo as a form of entertainment in the Heian period (794–1192). It has evolved over the centuries with professional sumo wrestlers appearing in the Edo period (1603–1868).

== Video games ==
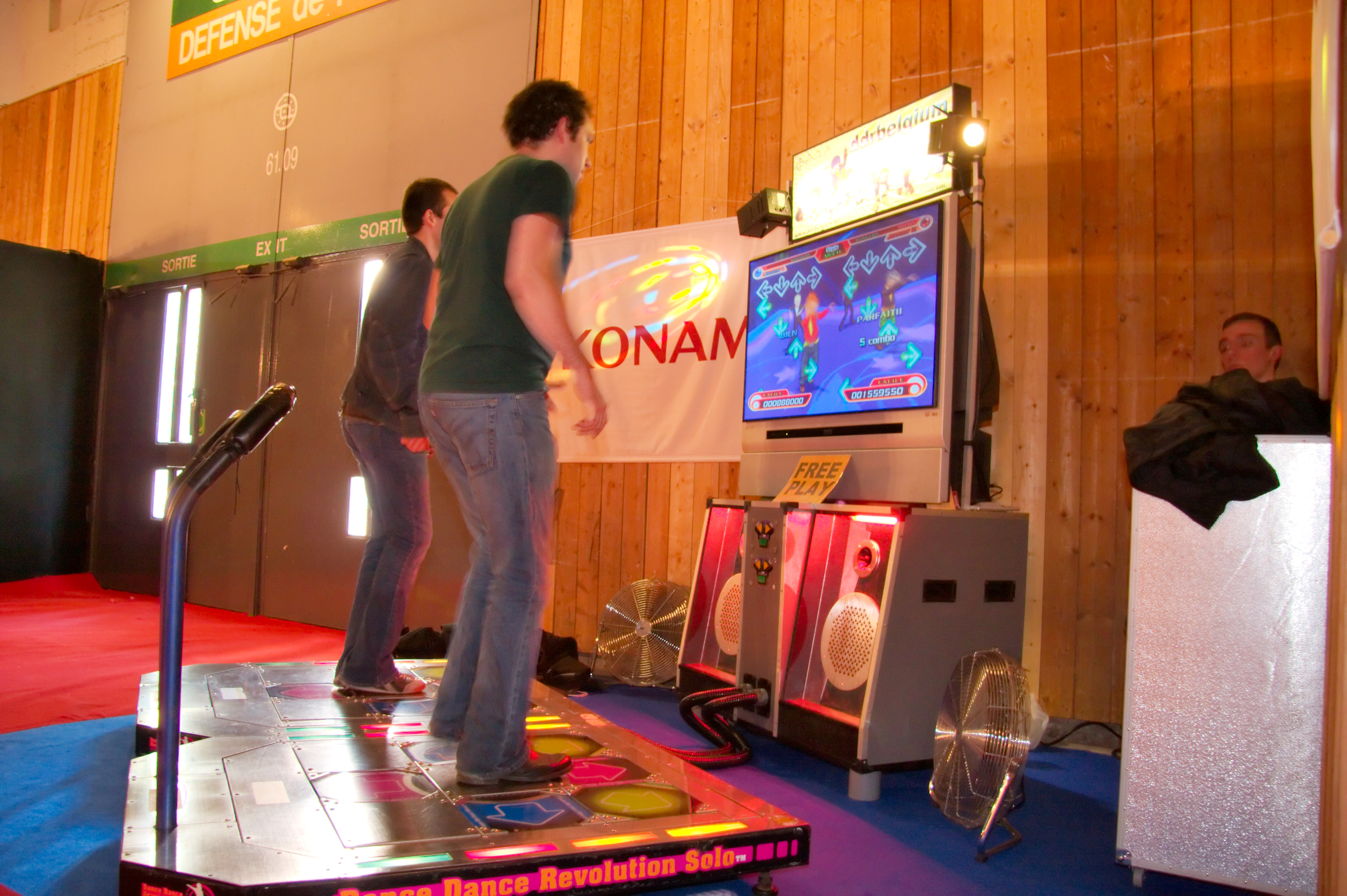
Playing Dance Dance Revolution, one of the most successful rhythm games

Active Time Battle
Hiroyuki Ito introduced the "Active Time Battle" system in Final Fantasy IV (1991), where the time-keeping system does not stop. Square Co., Ltd. filed a United States patent application for the ATB system on March 16, 1992, under the title "Video game apparatus, method and device for controlling same" and was awarded the patent on February 21, 1995. On the battle screen, each character has an ATB meter that gradually fills, and the player is allowed to issue a command to that character once the meter is full. The fact that enemies can attack or be attacked at any time is credited with injecting urgency and excitement into the combat system.
Beat 'em up
The first game to feature fist fighting was Sega's boxing game Heavyweight Champ (1976), but it was Data East's fighting game Karate Champ (1984) which popularized martial arts themed games. The same year, Hong Kong cinema-inspired Kung-Fu Master laid the foundations for scrolling beat 'em ups with its simple gameplay and multiple enemies. Nekketsu Kōha Kunio-kun, released in 1986 in Japan, deviated from the martial arts themes of earlier games and introduced street brawling to the genre. Renegade (released the same year) added an underworld revenge plot that proved more popular with gamers than the principled combat sport of other games. Renegade set the standard for future beat 'em up games as it introduced the ability to move both horizontally and vertically.
Bullet hell
The bullet hell or danmaku genre began to emerge in the early 1990s as 2D developers needed to find a way to compete with 3D games which were becoming increasingly popular at the time. Toaplan's Batsugun (1993) is considered to be the ancestor of the modern bullet hell genre. The Touhou Project series is one of the most popular bullet hell franchises.
Fighting game
Sega's black and white boxing game Heavyweight Champ was released in 1976 as the first video game to feature fist fighting. However, Data East's Karate Champ from 1984 is credited with establishing and popularizing the one-on-one fighting game genre, and went on to influence Konami's Yie Ar Kung-Fu from 1985. Yie Ar Kung Fu expanded on Karate Champ by pitting the player against a variety of opponents, each with a unique appearance and fighting style. Capcom's Street Fighter (1987) introduced the use of special moves that could only be discovered by experimenting with the game controls. Street Fighter II (1991) established the conventions of the fighting game genre and, whereas previous games allowed players to combat computer-controlled fighters, Street Fighter II allowed players to play against each other.
Nintendo
Gunpei Yokoi was the designer of the Game & Watch, Game Boy, Virtual Boy, and Game Boy Pocket. He also worked on the Famicom (and NES), and the Metroid series.

Platform game
Space Panic, a 1980 arcade release, is sometimes credited as the first platform game. It was clearly an influence on the genre, with gameplay centered on climbing ladders between different floors, a common element in many early platform games. Donkey Kong, an arcade game created by Nintendo, released in July 1981, was the first game that allowed players to jump over obstacles and across gaps, making it the first true platformer.

PlayStation
The first Sony PlayStation was invented by Ken Kutaragi. Research and development for the PlayStation began in 1990, headed by Kutaragi, a Sony engineer.

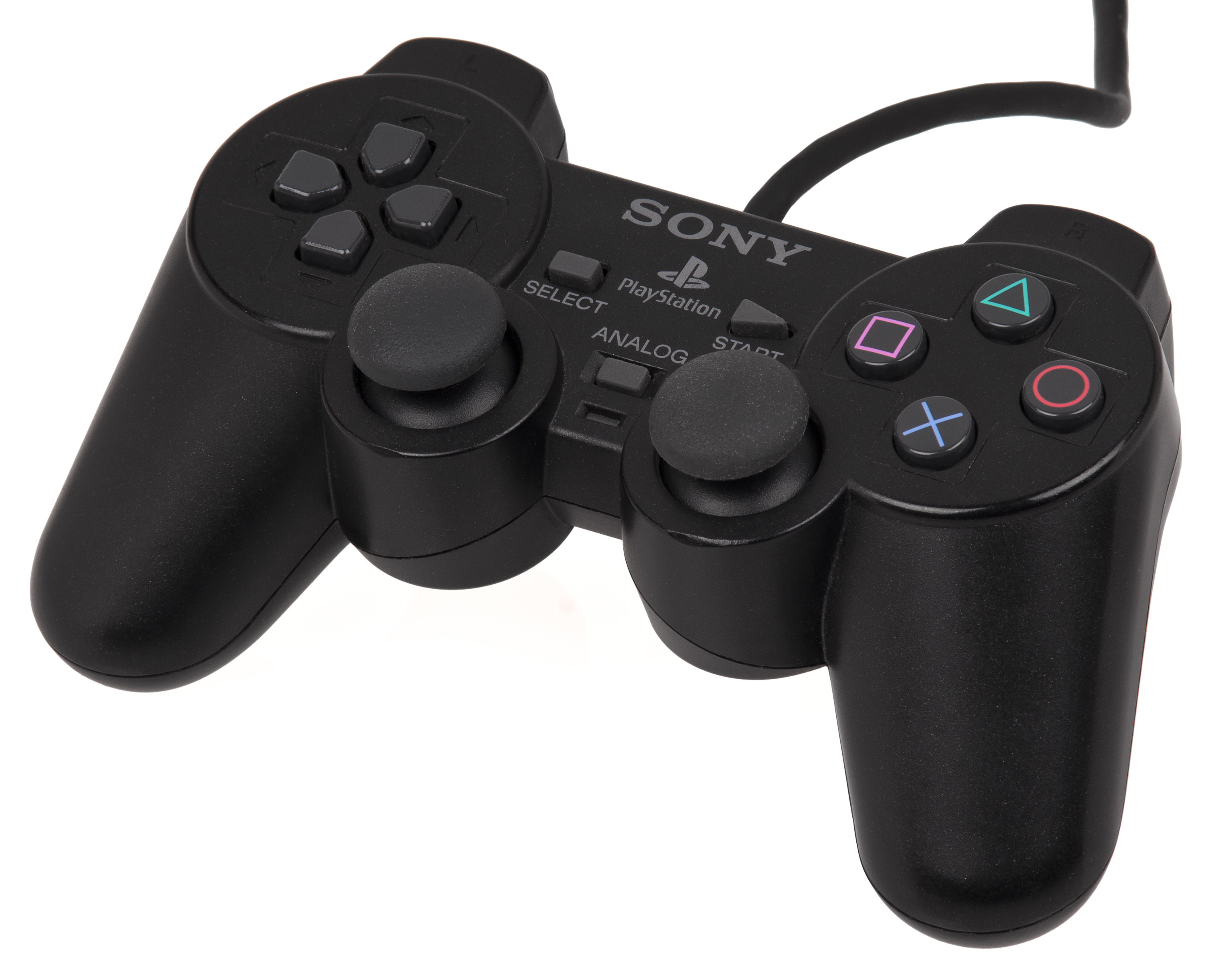
Controller of the PlayStation 2, the best-selling video game console of all time

Psychological horror game
Silent Hill (1999) was praised for moving away survival horror games from B movie horror elements to the psychological style seen in art house or J-Horror films, due to the game's emphasis on a disturbing atmosphere rather than visceral horror. The original Silent Hill is considered one of the scariest games of all time, and the strong narrative from Silent Hill 2 in 2001 has made the series one of the most influential in the genre. Fatal Frame from 2001 was a unique entry into the genre, as the player explores a mansion and takes photographs of ghosts in order to defeat them.

Rhythm game
Dance Aerobics was released in 1987 and allowed players to create music by stepping on Nintendo's Power Pad peripheral. It has been called the first rhythm-action game in retrospect, although the 1996 title PaRappa the Rapper has also been deemed the first rhythm game, whose basic template forms the core of subsequent games in the genre. In 1997, Konami's Beatmania sparked an emergent market for rhythm games in Japan. The company's music division, Bemani, released a number of music games over the next several years.

Scrolling platformer
The first platform game to use scrolling graphics was Jump Bug (1981), a simple platform-shooter developed by Alpha Denshi. In August 1982, Taito released Jungle King, which featured scrolling jump and run sequences that had players hopping over obstacles. Namco took the scrolling platformer a step further with the 1984 release Pac-Land. Pac-Land came after the genre had a few years to develop, and was an evolution of earlier platform games, aspiring to be more than a simple game of hurdle jumping, like some of its predecessors. It closely resembled later scrolling platformers like Wonder Boy and Super Mario Bros. and was probably a direct influence on them. It also had multi-layered parallax scrolling.

Shoot 'em up
Space Invaders is frequently cited as the "first" or "original" in the genre. Space Invaders pitted the player against multiple enemies descending from the top of the screen at a constantly increasing speed. As with subsequent shoot 'em ups of the time, the game was set in space as the available technology only permitted a black background. The game also introduced the idea of giving the player a number of "lives". Space Invaders was a massive commercial success, causing a coin shortage in Japan. The following year, Namco's Galaxian took the genre further with more complex enemy patterns and richer graphics.

Stealth game
The first stealth-based videogame was Hiroshi Suzuki's Manbiki Shounen (1979). The first commercially successful stealth game was Hideo Kojima's Metal Gear (1987), the first in the Metal Gear series. It was followed by Metal Gear 2: Solid Snake (1990) which significantly expanded the genre, and then Metal Gear Solid (1998).

Survival horror
The term survival horror was coined by Capcom's Resident Evil (1996) and definitely defined that genre. The game was inspired by Capcom's earlier horror game Sweet Home (1989). The earliest survival horror game was Nostromo, developed by Akira Takiguchi (a Tokyo University student and Taito contractor) for the PET 2001 and published by ASCII for the PC-6001 in 1981.

Visual novel
The visual novel genre is a type of Interactive fiction developed in Japan in the early 1990s. As the name suggests, visual novels typically have limited interactivity, as most player interaction is restricted to clicking text and graphics.

== Philosophy ==
Kokugaku
It was an academic movement, a school of Japanese philology and philosophy originating during the Edo period. Kokugaku scholars worked to refocus Japanese scholarship away from the then-dominant study of Chinese, Confucian, and Buddhist texts in favor of research into the early Japanese classics.
Lean manufacturing
A generic process management philosophy derived mostly from the Toyota Production System (TPS) (hence the term Toyotism is also prevalent) and identified as "Lean" only in the 1990s.

== Biology, chemistry, and biomedical science ==
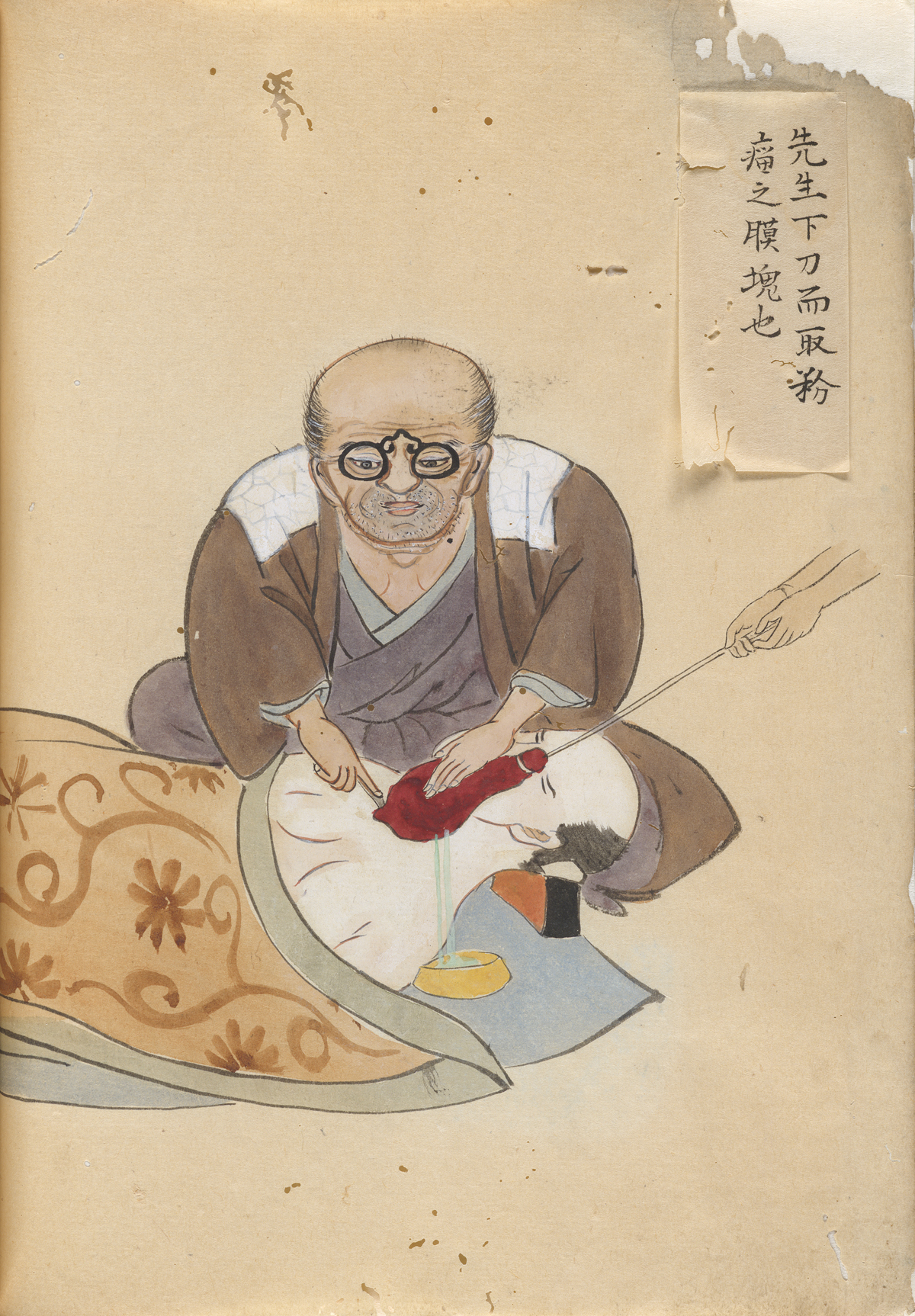
Image from "Surgical Casebook" (Kishitsu geryō zukan) by Hanaoka Seishu

Agar
Agar was discovered in Japan around 1658 by Mino Tarōzaemon.

Aspergillus oryzae
The genome for Aspergillus oryzae was sequenced and released by a consortium of Japanese biotechnology companies, in late 2005.

CRISPR
Yoshizumi Ishino discovered CRISPR in 1987.

Dementia with Lewy bodies
First described in 1976 by psychiatrist Kenji Kosaka. Kosaka was awarded the Asahi Prize in 2013 for his discovery.

Ephedrine synthesis
Ephedrine in its natural form, known as má huáng (麻黄) in traditional Chinese medicine, had been documented in China since the Han dynasty. However, it was not until 1885 that the chemical synthesis of ephedrine was first accomplished by Japanese organic chemist Nagai Nagayoshi.

Epinephrine (Adrenaline)
Japanese chemist Jōkichi Takamine and his assistant Keizo Uenaka first discovered epinephrine in 1900. In 1901 Takamine successfully isolated and purified the hormone from the adrenal glands of sheep and oxen.

Esophagogastroduodenoscope
Mutsuo Sugiura was a Japanese engineer famous for being the first to develop a Gastro-camera (a present-day Esophagogastroduodenoscope). His story was illustrated in the NHK TV documentary feature, "Project X: Challengers: The Development of a Gastro-camera Wholly Made in Japan". Sugiura graduated from Tokyo Polytechnic University in 1938 and then joined Olympus Corporation. While working at this company, he first developed an esophagogastroduodenoscope in 1950.

Frontier molecular orbital theory
Kenichi Fukui developed and published a paper on Frontier molecular orbital theory in 1952.
Fukui function
Kenichi Fukui investigated the frontier orbitals described by the function, specifically the HOMO and LUMO.

General anesthesia
Hanaoka Seishū was the first surgeon in the world who used the general anaesthesia in surgery, in 1804, and who dared to operate on cancers of the breast and oropharynx, to remove necrotic bone, and to perform amputations of the extremities in Japan.

Immunoglobulin E (IgE)
Immunoglobulin E is a type of antibody only found in mammals. IgE was simultaneously discovered in 1966-7 by two independent groups: Kimishige Ishizaka's team at the Children's Asthma Research Institute and Hospital in Denver, Colorado, and by Gunnar Johansson and Hans Bennich in Uppsala, Sweden. Their joint paper was published in April 1969.

Induced pluripotent stem cell
The induced pluripotent stem cell (iPSCs) is a kind of pluripotent stem cell which can be created using a mature cell. iPSCs technology was developed by Shinya Yamanaka and his lab workers in 2006.

Methamphetamine

Chemical structure of methamphetamine

Methamphetamine was first synthesized from ephedrine in Japan in 1894 by chemist Nagayoshi Nagai. In 1919, methamphetamine hydrochloride was synthesized by pharmacologist Akira Ogata.

Neutral theory of molecular evolution
First introduced by Motoo Kimura in 1968.

Nihonium
Element 113. Named after Nihon, the local name for Japan.

Okazaki fragment
Okazaki fragments are short, newly synthesized DNA fragments that are formed on the lagging template strand during DNA replication. They are complementary to the lagging template strand, together forming short double-stranded DNA sections. A series of experiments led to the discovery of Okazaki fragments. The experiments were conducted during the 1960s by Reiji Okazaki, Tsuneko Okazaki, Kiwako Sakabe, and their colleagues during their research on DNA replication of Escherichia coli. In 1966, Kiwako Sakabe and Reiji Okazaki first showed that DNA replication was a discontinuous process involving fragments. The fragments were further investigated by the researchers and their colleagues through their research including the study on bacteriophage DNA replication in Escherichia coli.

Photocatalysis
Akira Fujishima discovered photocatalysis occurring on the surface of titanium dioxide in 1967.

Portable electrocardiograph
Taro Takemi built the first portable electrocardiograph in 1937.

Pulse oximetry
Pulse oximetry was developed in 1972, by Takuo Aoyagi and Michio Kishi, bioengineers, at Nihon Kohden using the ratio of red to infrared light absorption of pulsating components at the measuring site. Susumu Nakajima, a surgeon, and his associates first tested the device in patients, reporting it in 1975.
Statin
The statin class of drugs was first discovered by Akira Endo, a Japanese biochemist working for the pharmaceutical company Sankyo. Mevastatin was the first discovered member of the statin class.

Takadiastase
A form of diastase which results from the growth, development and nutrition of a distinct microscopic fungus known as Aspergillus oryzae. Jōkichi Takamine developed the method first used for its extraction in the late 19th century.

Thiamine (Vitamin B_{1})
Thiamine was the first of the water-soluble vitamins to be described, leading to the discovery of more such trace compounds essential for survival and to the notion of vitamin. It was not until 1884 that Kanehiro Takaki (1849–1920) attributed beriberi to insufficient nitrogen intake (protein deficiency). In 1910, Japanese scientist Umetaro Suzuki succeeded in extracting a water-soluble complex of micronutrients from rice bran and named it aberic acid. He published this discovery in a Japanese scientific journal. The Polish biochemist Kazimierz Funk later proposed the complex be named "Vitamine" (a portmanteau of "vital amine") in 1912.

Urushiol
Urushiol, a mixture of alkyl catechols, was discovered by Rikou Majima. Majima also discovered that Urushiol was an allergen which gave members of the genus Toxicodendron, such as poison ivy and poison oak, their skin-irritating properties.

Vectorcardiography
Taro Takemi invented the vectorcardiograph in 1939.

== Computer Science ==
Convolutional neural network
Japanese scientist Kunihiko Fukushima introduced a multilayer visual feature detection network, inspired by the works of Hubel and Wiesel, in which "All the elements in one layer have the same set of interconnecting coefficients; the arrangement of the elements and their interconnections are all homogeneous over a given layer." This is the essential core of a convolutional network, but the weights were not trained. In the same paper, Fukushima also introduced the ReLU (rectified linear unit) activation function.

== Finance ==
Candlestick chart
Candlestick charts have been developed in the 18th century by Munehisa Homma, a Japanese rice trader of financial instruments. They were introduced to the Western world by Steve Nison in his book, Japanese Candlestick Charting Techniques.
Futures contract
The first futures exchange market was the Dōjima Rice Exchange in Japan in the 1730s.

== Food and food science ==
Fortune cookie
Although popular in Western Chinese restaurants, fortune cookies did not originate in China and are in fact rare there. They most likely originated from cookies made by Japanese immigrants to the United States in the late 19th or early 20th century. The Japanese version had a fortune, but not lucky numbers, and was commonly eaten with tea.
Instant noodle
Invented by Momofuku Ando, a Taiwanese-Japanese inventor, in 1958.

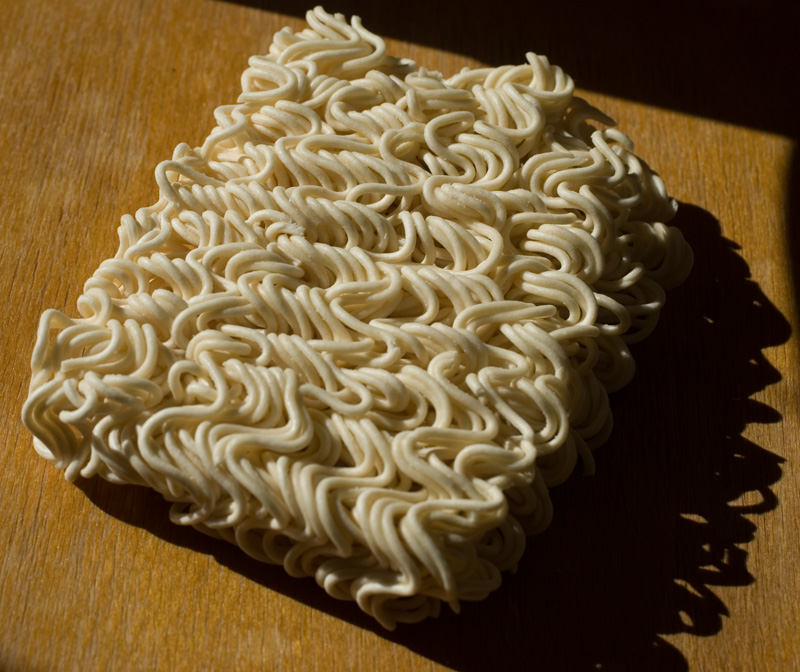
Instant noodles before boiling

Monosodium glutamate
Invented and patented by Kikunae Ikeda.

Umami
Umami as a separate taste was first identified in 1908 by Kikunae Ikeda of the Tokyo Imperial University while researching the strong flavor in seaweed broth.

== Mathematics ==
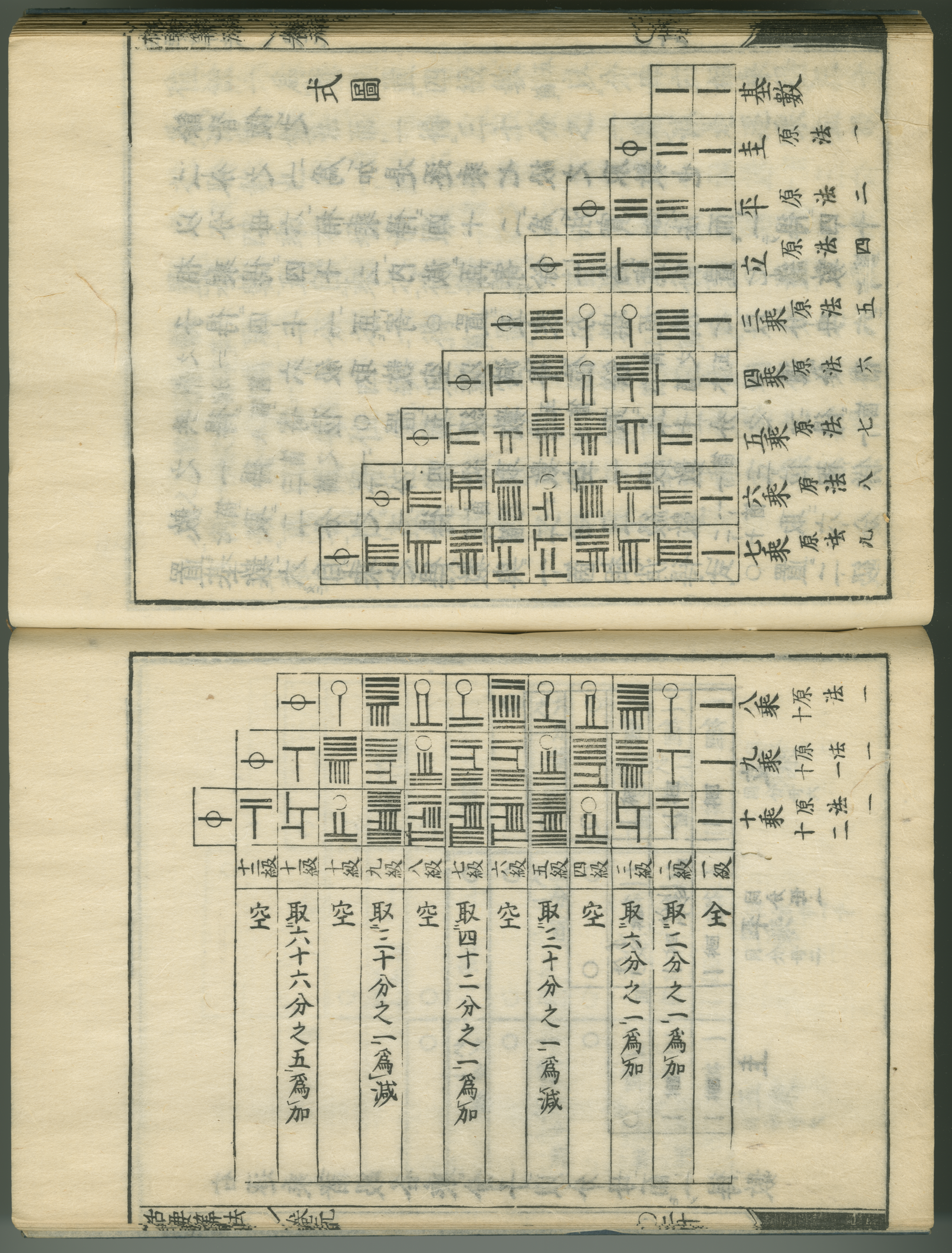
A page from Seki Kōwa's Katsuyo Sampo (1712), tabulating binomial coefficients and Bernoulli numbers

Bernoulli number
Studied by Seki Kōwa and published after his death, in 1712. Jacob Bernoulli independently developed the concept in the same period, though his work was published a year later.

Determinant
In Japan, determinants were introduced to study elimination of variables in systems of higher-order algebraic equations. They used it to give shorthand representation for the resultant. The determinant as an independent function was first studied by Seki Kōwa in 1683.
Enri
A mathematical system developed by Seki Kōwa that addressed problems involving areas, volumes, and infinite series.

Elimination theory
In 1683 (Kai-Fukudai-no-Hō), Seki Kōwa came up with elimination theory, based on resultant. To express resultant, he developed the notion of determinant.

Hironaka's example
Hironaka's example is a non-Kähler complex manifold that is a deformation of Kähler manifolds discovered by Heisuke Hironaka.

Itô calculus
Developed by Kiyosi Itô throughout the 20th century, Itô calculus extends calculus to stochastic processes such as Brownian motion (Wiener process). Its basic concept is the Itô integral, and among the most important results is a change of variable formula known as Itô's lemma. Itô calculus is widely applied in various fields, but is perhaps best known for its use in mathematical finance.

Iwasawa theory and the Main conjecture of Iwasawa theory
Initially created by Kenkichi Iwasawa, Iwasawa theory was originally developed as a Galois module theory of ideal class groups. The main conjecture of Iwasawa theory is a deep relationship between p-adic L-functions and ideal class groups of cyclotomic fields, proved by Iwasawa for primes satisfying the Kummer–Vandiver conjecture and proved for all primes by Mazur and Wiles.
Kodaira embedding theorem
Kodaira embedding theorem is a characterises non-singular projective varieties, over the complex numbers, amongst compact Kähler manifolds which was developed by mathematician Kunihiko Kodaira.
Kunita–Watanabe inequality
It is a generalization of the Cauchy–Schwarz inequality to integrals of stochastic processes. It was first obtained by Hiroshi Kunita and Shinzo Watanabe and plays a fundamental role in their extension of Ito's stochastic integral to square-integrable martingales.

Matroid theory
A branch of combinatorics that generalizes notions of independence from linear algebra and graph theory. It was introduced independently in 1935 by Japanese mathematician Takeo Nakasawa and American mathematician Hassler Whitney.

Power series
Power series expansion of $(\arcsin(x))^2$ was first obtained by Takebe Kenkō in 1722, 15 years earlier than Euler.
Resultant
In 1683 (Kai-Fukudai-no-Hō), Seki Kōwa came up with elimination theory, based on resultant. To express resultant, he developed the notion of determinant.

Sangaku
Japanese geometrical puzzles in Euclidean geometry on wooden tablets created during the Edo period (1603–1867) by members of all social classes. The Dutch Japanologist Isaac Titsingh first introduced sangaku to the West when he returned to Europe in the late 1790s after more than twenty years in the Far East.

Soddy's hexlet
Irisawa Shintarō Hiroatsu analyzed Soddy's hexlet in a Sangaku in 1822 and was the first person to do so.

Takagi existence theorem
Takagi existence theorem was developed by Teiji Takagi in isolation during World War I. He presented it at the International Congress of Mathematicians in 1920.

Taniyama–Shimura conjecture
A conjecture connecting elliptic curves with modular forms. It was first proposed by Yutaka Taniyama in 1955 and subsequently made more rigorous by Goro Shimura over the following years. In the 1960s, it received new attention after its discovery by André Weil and went on to play a key role in the proof of Fermat's Last Theorem.

== Physics ==
Cabibbo–Kobayashi–Maskawa matrix

Building off the work of Nicola Cabibbo, Makoto Kobayashi and Toshihide Maskawa introduced the Cabibbo–Kobayashi–Maskawa matrix which introduced for three generations of quarks. In 2008, Kobayashi and Maskawa shared one half of the Nobel Prize in Physics "for the discovery of the origin of the broken symmetry which predicts the existence of at least three families of quarks in nature".
Klein–Nishina formula
It was first derived in 1928 by Yoshio Nishina along with Oskar Klein constituting one of the first successful applications of the Dirac equation.
Meson
In 1935, Hideki Yukawa proposed a theory suggesting nuclear forces were mediated by a massive particle, later identified with the meson. The resulting interaction became an important concept in quantum field theory and Yukawa's work would earn him the Nobel Prize in Physics in 1949.
Nagaoka model (first Saturnian model of the atom)
In 1904, Hantaro Nagaoka proposed the first planetary model of the atom as an alternative to J. J. Thomson's plum pudding model. Ernest Rutherford and Niels Bohr would later develop the more viable Bohr model in 1913.
Nambu–Jona-Lasinio model
The model was introduced by Yoichiro Nambu.
Natural nuclear fission reactor
The possibility of naturally occcuring nuclear fission reactors was first proposed by Paul Kuroda in 1956. In 1972, the existence of such natural reactors was confirmed at Okla, Gabon by a team of French researchers.
Sakata model
The Sakata model was a precursor to the quark model proposed by Shoichi Sakata in 1956.
Tunneling
In 1957, Leo Esaki recognized that when the p–n junction width of germanium is thinned, the current–voltage characteristic is dominated by the influence of the tunnel effect. As a result, he discovered that as the voltage is increased, the current decreases inversely, indicating negative resistance.

== Technology ==
Airsoft
Airsoft originated in Japan, then spread to Hong Kong and China in the late 1970s. The inventor of the first airsoft gun is Tanio Kobayashi.

Blue Light Emitting Diode
In 1992 Japanese inventor Shuji Nakamura invented the first efficient blue LED.

Camera phone
The world's first camera phone (it also had a real-time-video-call functionality. It could send an email with a picture), the VP-210, was developed by Kyocera in 1999.

Digital microscope
Japanese company Hirox created the first ever digital microscope. A variation of a traditional microscope using optics and a digital camera to output an image to a monitor.

Double-coil bulb
In 1921, Junichi Miura created the first double-coil bulb using a coiled coil tungsten filament while working for Hakunetsusha (a predecessor of Toshiba). At the time, machinery to mass-produce coiled coil filaments did not exist. Hakunetsusha developed a method to mass-produce coiled coil filaments by 1936.

Japanese typewriter
The first typewriter to be based on the Japanese writing system was invented by Kyota Sugimoto in 1929.

KS steel
Magnetic resistant steel that is three times more resistant than tungsten steel, invented by Kotaro Honda.

MKM steel
MKM steel, an alloy containing nickel and aluminum, was developed in 1931 by the Japanese metallurgist Tokuhichi Mishima.

Neodymium magnet
Neodymium magnets were invented independently in 1982 by General Motors (GM) and Sumitomo Special Metals.

QR code

QR code for the URL of the English Wikipedia mobile main page

The QR code, a type of matrix barcode, was invented by Denso Wave in 1994.

Tactile paving
The original tactile paving was developed by Seiichi Miyake in 1965. The paving was first introduced in a street in Okayama city, Japan, in 1967. Its use gradually spread in Japan and then around the world.
TV Watch
The world's first TV watch, the TV-Watch, was developed by Seiko in 1982.

=== Audio technology ===
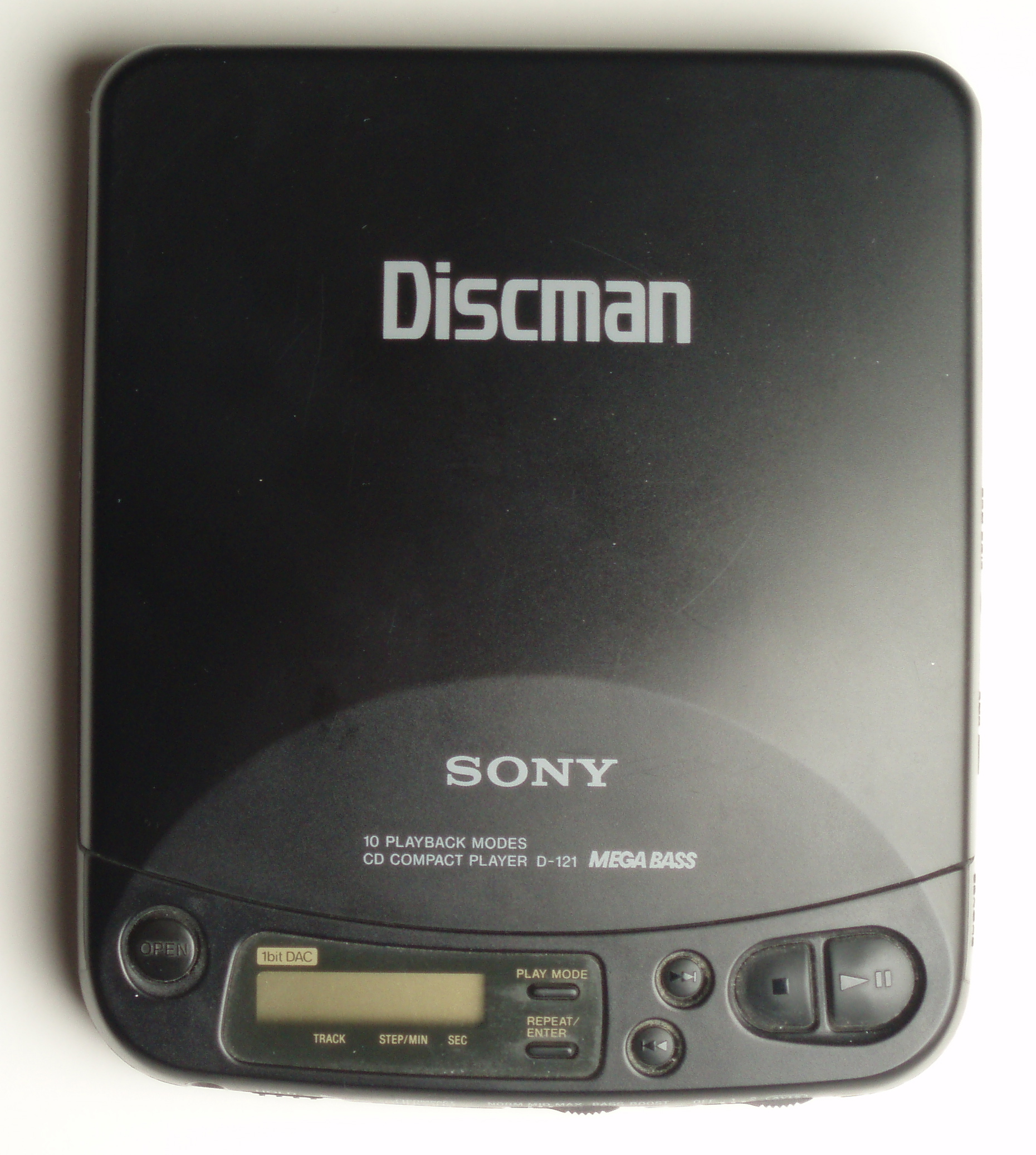
Sony Discman D121

CD player
Sony released the world's first CD Player, called the CDP-101, in 1982, using a slide-out tray design for the Compact Disc.

Commercial digital recording
Commercial digital recording was pioneered in Japan by NHK and Nippon Columbia, also known as Denon, in the 1960s. The first commercial digital recordings were released in 1971.

Digital audio tape recorder
In 1971, Heitaro Nakajima resigned from his post as head of NHK's Technical Research Laboratories and joined Sony. Four years earlier at NHK, Nakajima had commenced work on the digitization of sound and within two years had developed the first digital audio tape recorder.

Direct-drive turntable
Invented by Shuichi Obata, an engineer at Matsushita (now Panasonic), based in Osaka. In 1969, Matsushita released it as the SP-10, the first in their influential Technics series of turntables. The Technics SL-1100, released in 1971, was adopted by early hip hop DJs for turntablism, and the SL-1200 is still widely used by dance and hip hop DJs.

Karaoke
There are various disputes about who first invented the name karaoke (a Japanese word meaning "empty orchestra"). One claim is that the karaoke styled machine was invented by Japanese musician Daisuke Inoue in Kobe, Japan, in 1971.
Perpendicular recording
Perpendicular recording was first demonstrated in the late 19th century by Danish scientist Valdemar Poulsen, who was also the first person to demonstrate that sound could be recorded magnetically. There weren't many advances in perpendicular recording until 1976 when Dr. Shun-ichi Iwasaki (president of the Tohoku Institute of Technology in Japan) verified the distinct density advantages in perpendicular recording. Then in 1978, Dr. T. Fujiwara began an intensive research and development program at the Toshiba Corporation that eventually resulted in the perfection of floppy disk media optimized for perpendicular recording and the first commercially available magnetic storage devices using the technique.
Physical modelling synthesis
The first commercially available physical modelling synthesizer was Yamaha's VL-1 in 1994.

Portable CD player
Sony's Discman, released in 1984, was the first portable CD player.

Fully programmable drum machine
The Roland TR-808, also known as the 808, introduced by Roland in 1980, was the first fully programmable drum machine. It was the first drum machine with the ability to program an entire percussion track from beginning to end, complete with breaks and rolls. Created by Ikutaro Kakehashi, the 808 has been fundamental to hip hop music and electronic dance music since the 1980s, making it one of the most influential inventions in popular music.

Phaser effects pedal
In 1968, Shin-ei's Uni-Vibe effects pedal, designed by audio engineer Fumio Mieda, incorporated phase shift and chorus effects, soon becoming favorite effects of guitarists such as Jimi Hendrix and Robin Trower.

Vowel-Consonant synthesis
A type of hybrid Digital-analogue synthesis first employed by the early Casiotone keyboards in the early 1980s.

=== Batteries ===
Lithium-ion battery
Akira Yoshino invented the modern li-ion battery in 1985. In 1991, Sony and Asahi Kasei released the first commercial lithium-ion battery using Yoshino's design.

Dry cell
The world's first dry-battery was invented in Japan during the Meiji Era. The inventor was Sakizou Yai. The company Yai founded no longer exists
Tunnel diode
Tunnel diode was invented in August 1957 by Leo Esaki and Yuriko Kurose when working at Tokyo Tsushin Kogyo, now known as Sony.

=== Calculators ===
Pocket calculator
The first portable calculators appeared in Japan in 1970, and were soon marketed around the world. These included the Sanyo ICC-0081 "Mini Calculator", the Canon Pocketronic, and the Sharp QT-8B "micro Compet". Sharp put in great efforts in size and power reduction and introduced in January 1971 the Sharp EL-8, also marketed as the Facit 1111, which was close to being a pocket calculator. It weighed about one pound, had a vacuum fluorescent display, and rechargeable NiCad batteries. The first truly pocket-sized electronic calculator was the Busicom LE-120A "HANDY", which was marketed early in 1971.

=== Cameras ===
Digital single-lens reflex camera
On August 25, 1981 Sony unveiled a prototype of the first still video camera, the Sony Mavica. This camera was an analog electronic camera that featured interchangeable lenses and a SLR viewfinder. At photokina in 1986, Nikon revealed a prototype analog electronic still SLR camera, the Nikon SVC, the first digital SLR. The prototype body shared many features with the N8008.
Portapak
In 1967, Sony unveiled the first self-contained video tape analog recording system that was portable.

=== Chindōgu ===
Chindōgu is the Japanese art of inventing ingenious everyday gadgets that, on the face of it, seem like an ideal solution to a particular problem. However, Chindōgu has a distinctive feature: anyone actually attempting to use one of these inventions would find that it causes so many new problems, or such significant social embarrassment, that effectively it has no utility whatsoever. Thus, Chindōgu are sometimes described as "unuseless" – that is, they cannot be regarded as 'useless' in an absolute sense, since they do actually solve a problem; however, in practical terms, they cannot positively be called "useful." The term "Chindōgu" was coined by Kenji Kawakami.

=== Domestic appliances ===
Bladeless fan
The first bladeless fan was patented by Toshiba in 1981.

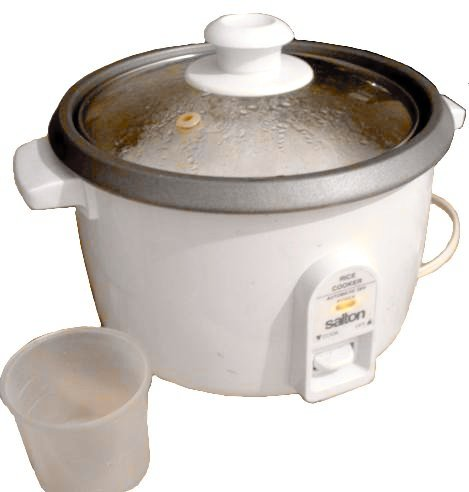
Electric rice cooker

Bread machine
The bread machine was developed and released in Japan in 1986 by the Matsushita Electric Industrial Company.

Electric rice cooker
Invented by designers at the Toshiba Corporation in the late 1940s.

RFIQin
An automatic cooking device, invented by Mamoru Imura and patented in 2007.

Inverter Air Conditioner
Created by Toshiba in 1981 as an alternative to the standard home window Air conditioner, With the difference being in the compressor that is able to cool or warm a room to the intended temperature as quickly as possible while efficiently maintaining the desired temperature unlike standard AC units in which the compressor frequently turns off. Inverter AC units do not turn off only operating at a certain consistent speed while also being able to adjust its regularity.

=== Electronics ===
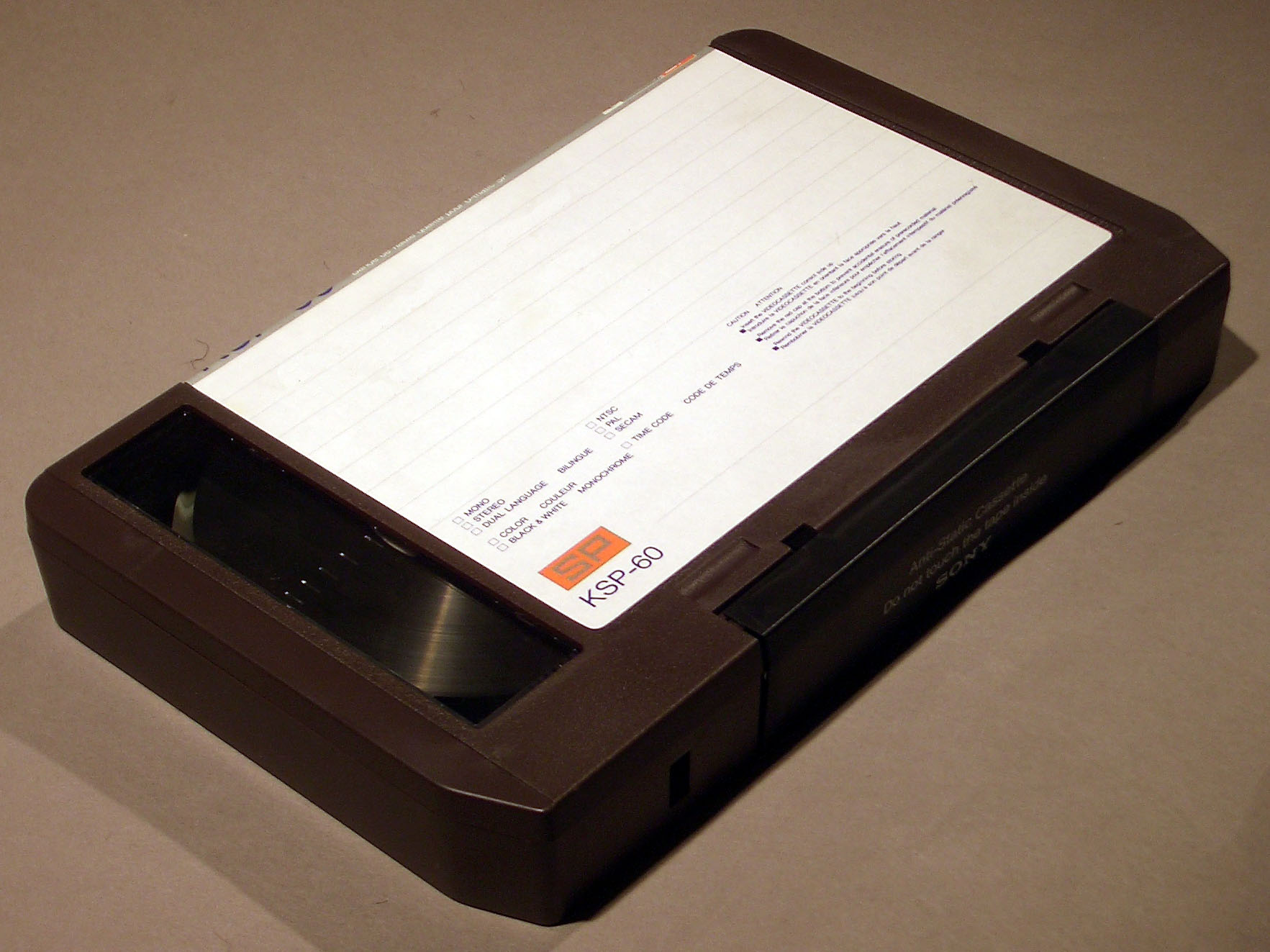
Sony U-matic cassette recorder tape

Avalanche photodiode
Invented by Jun-ichi Nishizawa in 1952.

Continuous wave semiconductor laser
Invented by Izuo Hayashi and Morton B. Panish in 1970. This led directly to the light sources in fiber-optic communication, laser printers, barcode readers, and optical disc drives, technologies that were commercialized by Japanese entrepreneurs.

Fiber-optic communication
While working at Tohoku University, Jun-ichi Nishizawa proposed the use of optical fibers for optical communication, in 1963. Nishizawa invented other technologies that contributed to the development of optical fiber communications, such as the graded-index optical fiber as a channel for transmitting light from semiconductor lasers. Izuo Hayashi's invention of the continuous wave semiconductor laser in 1970 led directly to light sources in fiber-optic communication, commercialized by Japanese entrepreneurs.

Glass integrated circuit
Shunpei Yamazaki invented an integrated circuit made entirely from glass and with an 8-bit central processing unit.

JFET (junction gate field-effect transistor)
The first type of JFET was the static induction transistor (SIT), invented by Japanese engineers Jun-ichi Nishizawa and Y. Watanabe in 1950. The SIT is a type of JFET with a short channel length.

Notebook computer
Yukio Yokozawa, an employee for Suwa Seikosha, a branch of Seiko (now Seiko Epson), invented the first notebook computer in July 1980, receiving a patent for the invention. Seiko's notebook computer, known as the HC-20 in Japan, was announced in 1981. In North America, Epson introduced it as the Epson HX-20 in 1981, at the COMDEX computer show in Las Vegas, where it drew significant attention for its portability. It had a mass-market release in July 1982, as the HC-20 in Japan and as the Epson HX-20 in North America. It was the first notebook-sized handheld computer, the size of an A4 notebook and weighing 1.6 kg (3.5 lb). In 1983, the Sharp PC-5000 and Ampere WS-1 laptops from Japan featured a modern clamshell design.

Microcomputer for Automotive Engine
Toshiba developed a close relationship with Ford for the supply of rectifier diodes for automobile AC alternators. In March 1971, Ford unexpectedly sent a set bulky specifications asking Toshiba to join a project to make an electronic engine control (EEC) in response to US Clean Air Act (sometimes known as the Muskie Act).

Parametron
Eiichi Goto invented the parametron in 1954 as an alternative to the vacuum tube. Early Japanese computers used parametrons until they were superseded by transistors.

PIN diode/photodiode
Invented by Jun-ichi Nishizawa and his colleagues in 1950.

Plastic central processing unit
Shunpei Yamazaki invented a central processing unit made entirely from plastic.

Quantum flux parametron
Eiichi Goto invented the quantum flux parametron in 1986 using superconducting Josephson junctions on integrated circuits as an improvement over existing parametron technology.

Radio-controlled wheel transmitter
Futaba introduced the FP-T2F in 1974 that was the first to use a steering wheel onto a box transmitter. KO Propo introduced the EX-1 in 1981 that integrated a wheel with a pistol grip with its trigger acting as the throttle. This became one of the two types of radio controlled transmitters currently for surface use.

Semiconductor laser
Invented by Jun-ichi Nishizawa in 1957.

Solid-state maser
Invented by Jun-ichi Nishizawa in 1955.

Static induction transistor
Invented by Jun-ichi Nishizawa and Y. Watanabe in 1950.

Stored-program transistor computer
The ETL Mark III began development in 1954, and was completed in 1956, created by the Electrotechnical Laboratory. It was the first stored-program transistor computer.

Switching circuit theory
From 1934 to 1936, NEC engineer Akira Nakashima introduced switching circuit theory in a series of papers showing that two-valued Boolean algebra, which he discovered independently, can describe the operation of switching circuits.

Videocassette recorder
The first machines (the VP-1100 videocassette player and the VO-1700 videocassette recorder) to use the first videocassette format, U-matic, were introduced by Sony in 1971.

=== Game controllers ===
D-pad
In 1982, Nintendo's Gunpei Yokoi elaborated on the idea of a circular pad, shrinking it and altering the points into the familiar modern "cross" design for control of on-screen characters in their Donkey Kong handheld game. It came to be known as the "D-pad". The design proved to be popular for subsequent Game & Watch titles. This particular design was patented. In 1984, the Japanese company Epoch created a handheld game system called the Epoch Game Pocket Computer. It featured a D-pad, but it was not popular for its time and soon faded. Initially intended to be a compact controller for the Game & Watch handheld games alongside the prior non-connected style pad, Nintendo realized that Gunpei's design would also be appropriate for regular consoles, and Nintendo made the D-pad the standard directional control for the hugely successful Nintendo Entertainment System under the name "+Control Pad".

Motion-sensing controller
Invented by Nintendo for the Wii, the Wii Remote is the first controller with motion-sensing capability. It was a candidate for Time's Best Invention of 2006.

=== Printing ===
3D printing
In 1981, Hideo Kodama of Nagoya Municipal Industrial Research Institute invented two additive methods for fabricating three-dimensional plastic models with photo-hardening thermoset polymer, where the UV exposure area is controlled by a mask pattern or a scanning fiber transmitter.

Hydrographics
Hydrographics, also known variously as immersion printing, water transfer printing, water transfer imaging, hydro dipping, or cubic printing has an somewhat fuzzy history. Three different Japanese companies are given credit for its invention. Taica Corporation claims to have invented cubic printing in 1974. However, the earliest hydrographic patent was filed by Motoyasu Nakanishi of Kabushiki Kaisha Cubic Engineering in 1982.

=== Robotics ===
Android
Waseda University initiated the WABOT project in 1967, and in 1972 completed the WABOT-1, the world's first full-scale humanoid intelligent robot. Its limb control system allowed it to walk with the lower limbs, and to grip and transport objects with hands, using tactile sensors. Its vision system allowed it to measure distances and directions to objects using external receptors, artificial eyes and ears. And its conversation system allowed it to communicate with a person in Japanese, with an artificial mouth. This made it the first android.

Actroid

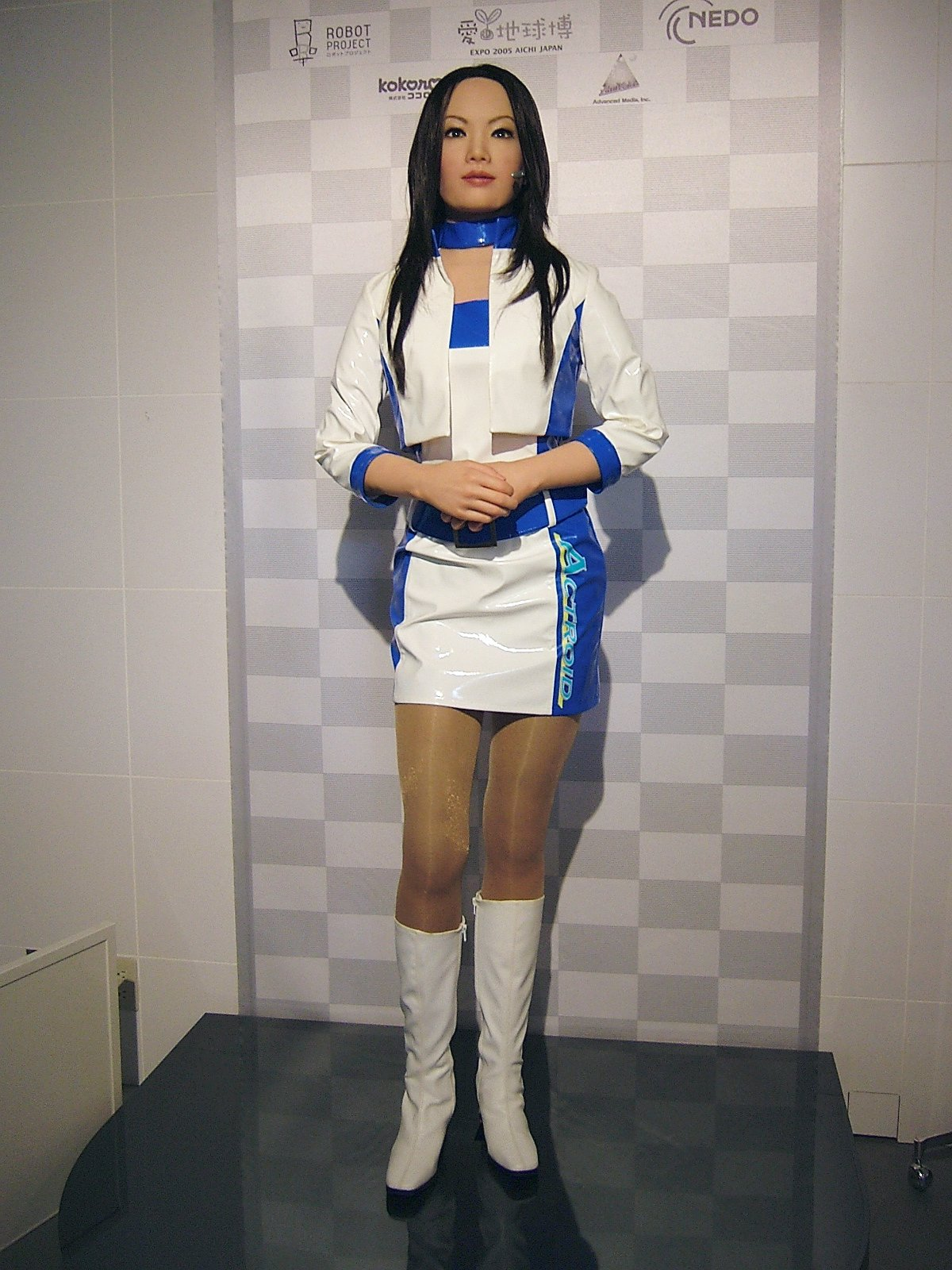
DER-01, a Japanese actroid (an android intended to be very visually similar to humans)

DER 01 was developed by a Japanese research group, The Intelligent Robotics Lab, directed by Hiroshi Ishiguro at Osaka University, and Kokoro Co., Ltd. The Actroid is a humanoid robot with strong visual human-likeness developed by Osaka University and manufactured by Kokoro Company Ltd. (the animatronics division of Sanrio). It was first unveiled at the 2003 International Robot Exposition in Tokyo, Japan. The Actroid woman is a pioneer example of a real machine similar to imagined machines called by the science fiction terms android or gynoid, so far used only for fictional robots. It can mimic such lifelike functions as blinking, speaking, and breathing. The "Repliee" models are interactive robots with the ability to recognise and process speech and respond in kind.

Karakuri puppet
Karakuri puppets (からくり人形, karakuri ningyō) are traditional Japanese mechanized puppets or automata, originally made from the 17th century to the 19th century. The word karakuri means "mechanisms" or "trick". The dolls' gestures provided a form of entertainment. Three main types of karakuri exist. Butai karakuri (舞台からくり, stage karakuri) were used in theatre. Zashiki karakuri (座敷からくり, tatami room karakuri) were small and used in homes. Dashi karakuri (山車からくり, festival car karakuri) were used in religious festivals, where the puppets were used to perform reenactments of traditional myths and legends.

Robotic exoskeleton for motion support (medicine)
The first HAL prototype was proposed by Yoshiyuki Sankai, a professor at Tsukuba University. Fascinated with robots since he was in the third grade, Sankai had striven to make a robotic suit in order "to support humans." In 1989, after receiving his Ph.D. in robotics, he began the development of HAL. Sankai spent three years, from 1990 to 1993, mapping out the neurons that govern leg movement. It took him and his team an additional four years to make a prototype of the hardware.

=== Space exploration ===
Interplanetary solar sail spacecraft
IKAROS the world's first successful interplanetary solar sail spacecraft was launched by JAXA on 21 May 2010.

=== Storage technology ===
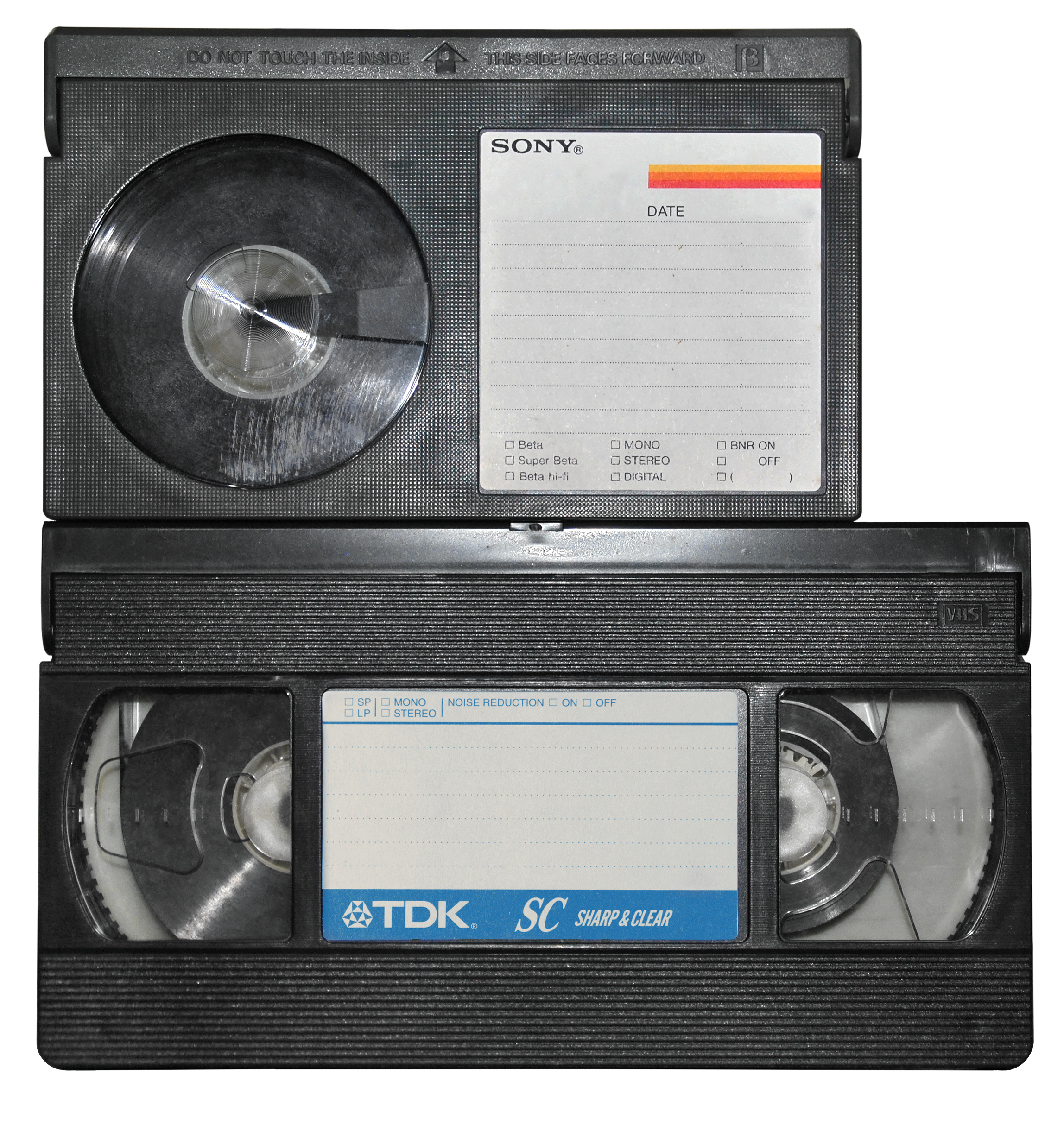
Betamax (top) and VHS (bottom) tapes were respectively created by Japanese companies Sony and JVC.

Blu-ray Disc (along with other nations)
After Shuji Nakamura's invention of practical blue laser diodes, Sony started two projects applying the new diodes: UDO (Ultra Density Optical) and DVR Blue (together with Pioneer), a format of rewritable discs which would eventually become the Blu-ray Disc. The Blu-ray Disc Association was founded by Massachusetts Institute of Technology along with nine companies: five from Japan, two from Korea, one from the Netherlands and one from France.

Compact Disc (also Dutch company Philips)
The compact disc was jointly developed by Philips (Joop Sinjou) and Sony (Toshitada Doi). Sony first publicly demonstrated an optical digital audio disc in September 1976. In September 1978, they demonstrated an optical digital audio disc with a 150 minute playing time, and with specifications of 44,056 Hz sampling rate, 16-bit linear resolution, cross-interleaved error correction code, that were similar to those of the Compact Disc they introduced in 1982.

Digital video disc (also Dutch company Philips)
The DVD, first developed in 1995, resulted from a cooperation between three Japanese companies (Sony, Toshiba and Panasonic) and one Dutch company (Philips).

Flash memory
Flash memory (both NOR and NAND types) was invented by Dr. Fujio Masuoka while working for Toshiba c. 1980.

Betamax
Betamax was an analog videocassette magnetic tape marketed to consumers released by Sony on May 10, 1975.

VHS (Video Home System)
The VHS was invented in 1973 by Yuma Shiraishi and Shizuo Takano who worked for JVC.

Helical scan
Norikazu Sawazaki invented a prototype helical scan video tape recorder in 1953. In 1959, Toshiba released the first commercial helical scan video tape recorder.

=== Television ===
All-electronic television
In 1926, Kenjiro Takayanagi invented the world's first all-electronic television, preceding Philo T. Farnsworth by several months. By 1927, Takayanagi improved the resolution to 100 lines, which was not surpassed until 1931. By 1928, he was the first to transmit human faces in halftones. His work had an influence on the later work of Vladimir K. Zworykin.

Aperture grille
One of two major cathode ray tube (CRT) display technologies, along with the older shadow mask. Aperture grille was introduced by Sony with their Trinitron television in 1968.

Color plasma display
The world's first color plasma display was produced by Fujitsu in 1989.

Handheld television
In 1970, Panasonic released the first television that was small enough to fit in a large pocket, the Panasonic IC TV MODEL TR-001. It featured a 1.5-inch display, along with a 1.5-inch speaker.

LCD television
The first LCD televisions were invented as handheld televisions in Japan. In 1980, Hattori Seiko's R&D group began development on color LCD pocket televisions. In 1982, Seiko Epson released the first LCD television, the Epson TV Watch, a wristwatch equipped with an active-matrix LCD television. In 1983, Casio released a handheld LCD television, the Casio TV-10.

LED-backlit LCD
The world's first LED-backlit LCD television was Sony's Qualia 005, released in 2004.

Laser TV

World's first HD laser TV was produced by Mitsubishi Electric in 2008.

=== Textiles ===
Automatic power loom with a non-stop shuttle-change motion
Sakichi Toyoda invented numerous weaving devices. His most famous invention was the automatic power loom in which he implemented the principle of Jidoka (autonomation or autonomous automation). It was the 1924 Toyoda Automatic Loom, Type G, a completely automatic high-speed loom featuring the ability to change shuttles without stopping and dozens of other innovations. At the time it was the world's most advanced loom, delivering a dramatic improvement in quality and a twenty-fold increase in productivity.This loom automatically stopped when it detected a problem such as thread breakage.

Vinylon
The second man-made fiber to be invented, after nylon. It was first developed by Ichiro Sakurada, H. Kawakami, and Korean scientist Ri Sung-gi at the Takatsuki chemical research center in 1939 in Japan.

=== Timekeeping ===
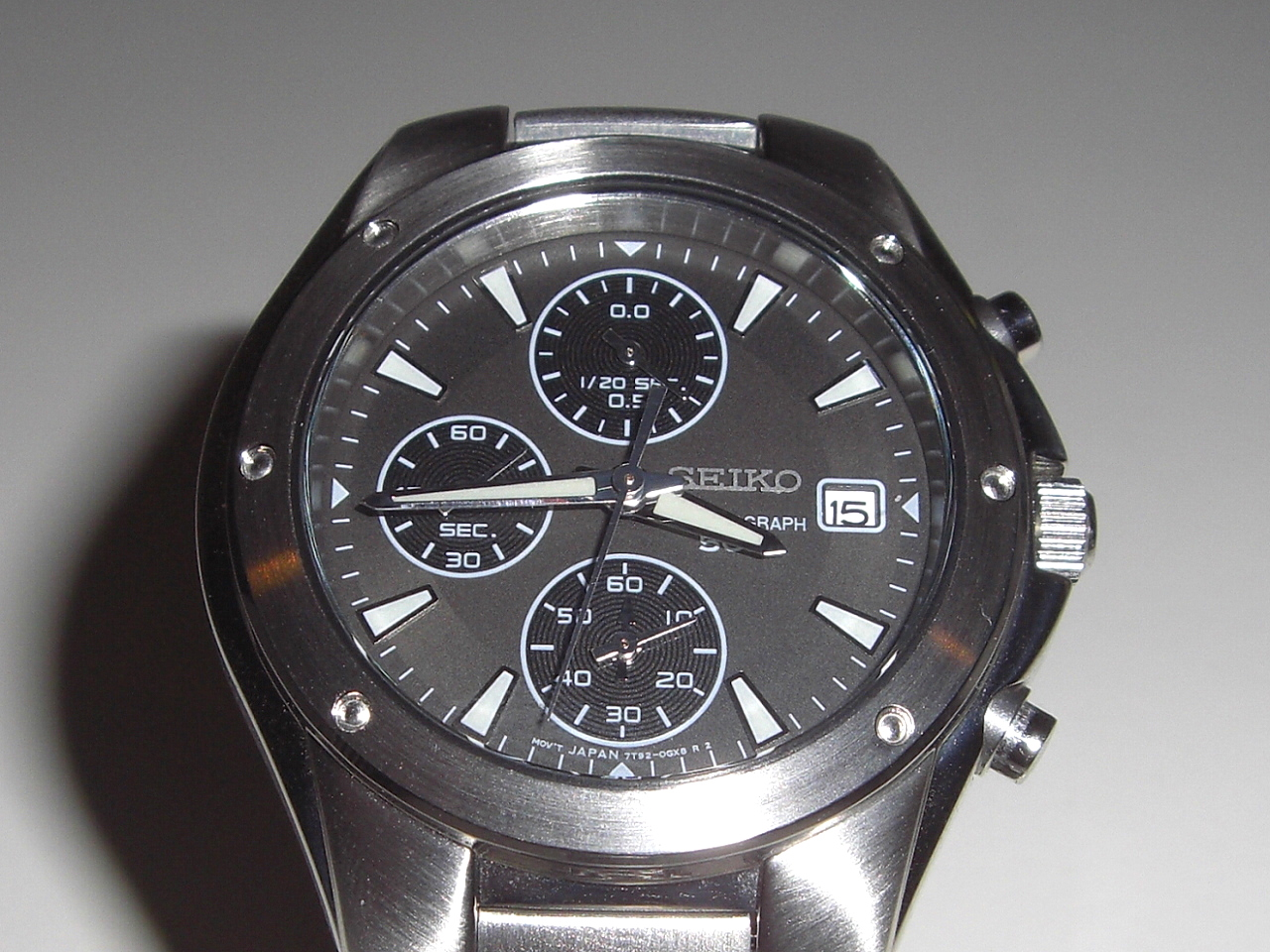
2A Seiko quartz wristwatch using the chronograph function (movement 7T92)

Automatic quartz
The first watch to combine self-winding with a crystal oscillator for timekeeping was unveiled by Seiko in 1986.

Myriad year clock
The Myriad year clock (万年自鳴鐘 Mannen Jimeishou, lit. Ten-Thousand Year Self-ringing Bell), was a universal clock designed by the Japanese inventor Hisashige Tanaka in 1851. It belongs to the category of Japanese clocks called Wadokei.

Quartz wristwatch
The world's first quartz wristwatch was revealed in 1967: the prototype of the Astron revealed by Seiko in Japan, where it was in development since 1958. It was eventually released to the public in 1969.

Spring Drive
A watch movement which was first conceived by Yoshikazu Akahane working for Seiko in 1977 and was patented in 1982. It features a true continuously sweeping second hand, rather than the traditional beats per time unit, as seen with traditional mechanical and most quartz watches.

=== Transportation ===
Bullet train
The world's first high volume capable (initially 12 car maximum) "high-speed train" was Japan's Tōkaidō Shinkansen, which officially opened in October 1964, with construction commencing in April 1959. The 0 Series Shinkansen, built by Kawasaki Heavy Industries, achieved maximum passenger service speeds of 210 km/h (130 mph) on the Tokyo–Nagoya–Kyoto–Osaka route, with earlier test runs hitting top speeds in 1963 at 256 km/h.

Electronically controlled continuously variable transmission
In early 1987, Subaru launched the Justy in Tokyo with an electronically-controlled continuously variable transmission (ECVT) developed by Fuji Heavy Industries, which owns Subaru.

Self-driving car
The first self-driving car that did not rely upon wires under the road is designed by the Tsukuba Mechanical Engineering Laboratory in 1977. The car was equipped with two cameras that used analog computer technology for signal processing, aided by an elevated rail.

Hybrid electric vehicle
The first commercial hybrid vehicle was the Toyota Prius launched in 1997.

Hydrogen car
In 2014, Toyota launched the first production hydrogen fuel cell vehicle, the Toyota Mirai. The Mirai has a range of 312 miles (502 km) and takes about five minutes to refuel. The initial sale price was roughly 7 million yen ($69,000).

Kei car
A category of small automobiles, including passenger cars, vans, and pickup trucks. They are designed to exploit local tax and insurance relaxations, and in more rural areas are exempted from the requirement to certify that adequate parking is available for the vehicle.

Rickshaw
A two or three-wheeled passenger cart seating one or two people that serves as a mode of human-powered transport pulled by a runner draws a two-wheeled cart. The rickshaws was invented in Japan around 1869, after the lifting of a ban on wheeled vehicles from the Tokugawa period (1603–1868), and at the beginning of a rapid period of technical advancement across the Japanese archipelago.

Spiral escalator
Mitsubishi Electric unveiled the world's first practical spiral escalator in 1985. Spiral escalators have the advantage of taking up less space than their conventional counterparts.

Inverter-Controlled High-Speed Gearless Elevator
The insulated gate bipolar transistors (IGBTs) realized increased switching frequency and reduced magnetic noise in the motor, which eliminated the need for a filter circuit and resulted in a more compact system. The IGBT also allowed the development of a small, highly integrated and highly sophisticated all-digital control device, consisting of the combination of a high-speed processor, specially customized gate arrays, and a circuit capable of controlling large currents of several kHz. Today, the inverter-controlled gearless drive system is applied in high-speed elevators worldwide.

Personal watercraft
Kawasaki were the first to develop stand-up personal watercraft under their trademark Jet Ski. While experimentation with personal watercraft preceded this, the Jet Ski was the first commercially successful and practical PWC.

=== Military ===
Amphibious assault ship
Imperial Japanese Army Akitsu maru is regarded as the first of the kind.

Dock landing ship
Imperial Japanese Army Shinshu maru is regarded as the first of the kind.

Fire balloon
A fire balloon, or balloon bomb, was an experimental weapon launched by Japan from 1944 to 1945, during World War II.

Diesel-powered tank
The world's first diesel-powered tank, this distinction goes to Japanese Type 89B I-Go Otsu, produced with a diesel engine from 1934 onwards.

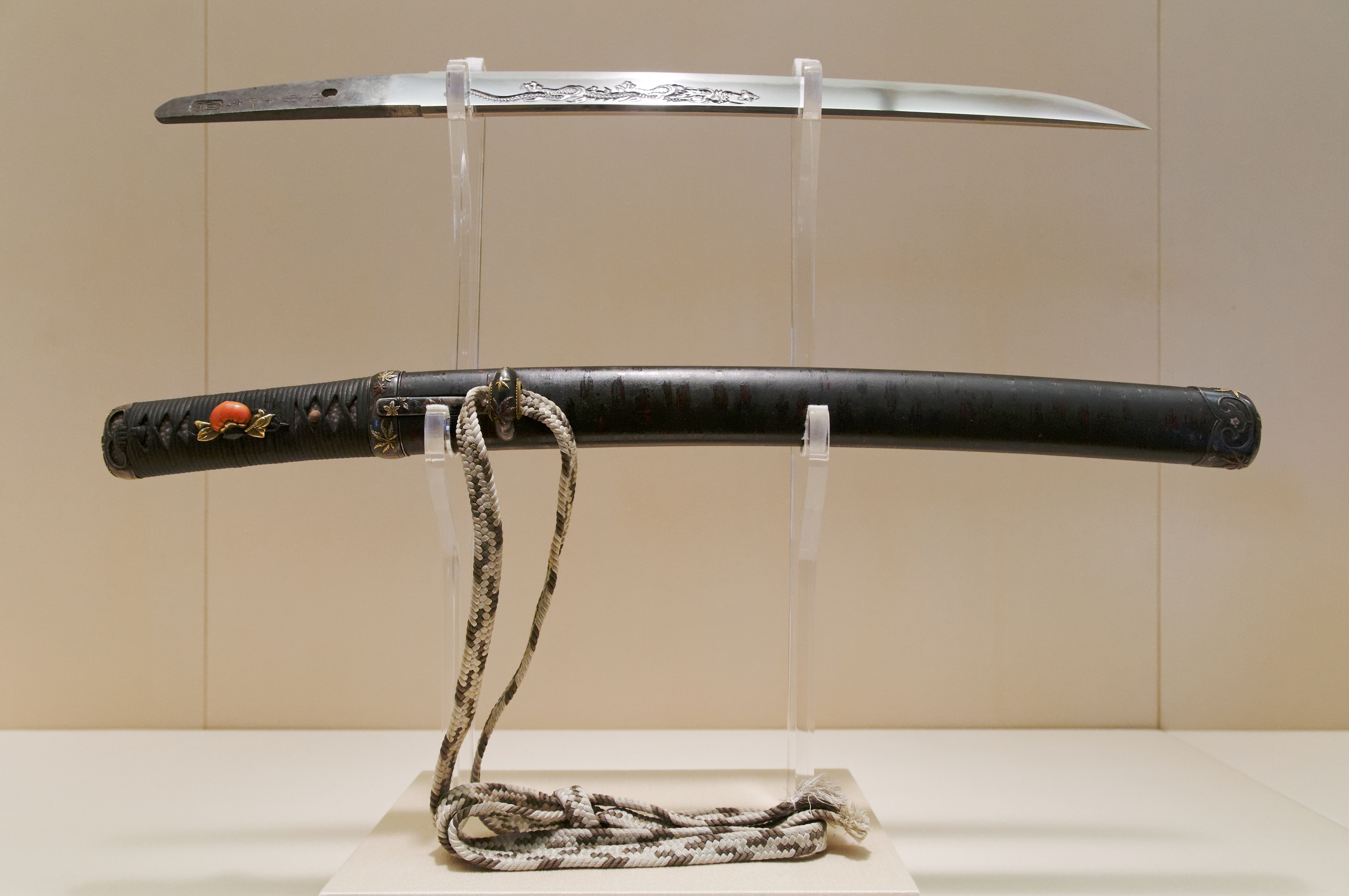
Katana

Katana
The katana were traditional Japanese swords used by samurai warriors of ancient and feudal Japan. The swords originated in the Muromachi period (1392–1573) as a result of changing battle conditions requiring faster response times. The katana facilitated this by being worn with the blade facing up, which allowed the samurai to draw their blade and slash at their enemy in a single motion. Previously, the curved sword of the samurai was worn with the blade facing down. The ability to draw and cut in one motion also became increasingly useful in the daily life of the samurai.

Shimose powder
An explosive powder invented by Shimose Masachika and deployed by the Imperial Japanese Navy in 1893.

Shuriken
The shuriken was invented during the Gosannen War as a concealed weapon, primarily for the purpose of distracting a target.

=== Wireless transmission ===
Meteor burst communications
The first observation of interaction between meteors and radio propagation was reported by Hantaro Nagaoka in 1929.
Yagi antenna
The Yagi-Uda antenna was invented in 1926 by Shintaro Uda of Tohoku Imperial University, Sendai, Japan, with the collaboration of Hidetsugu Yagi, also of Tohoku Imperial University. Yagi published the first English-language reference on the antenna in a 1928 survey article on short wave research in Japan and it came to be associated with his name. However, Yagi always acknowledged Uda's principal contribution to the design, and the proper name for the antenna is, as above, the Yagi-Uda antenna (or array).

=== Writing and correction implements ===
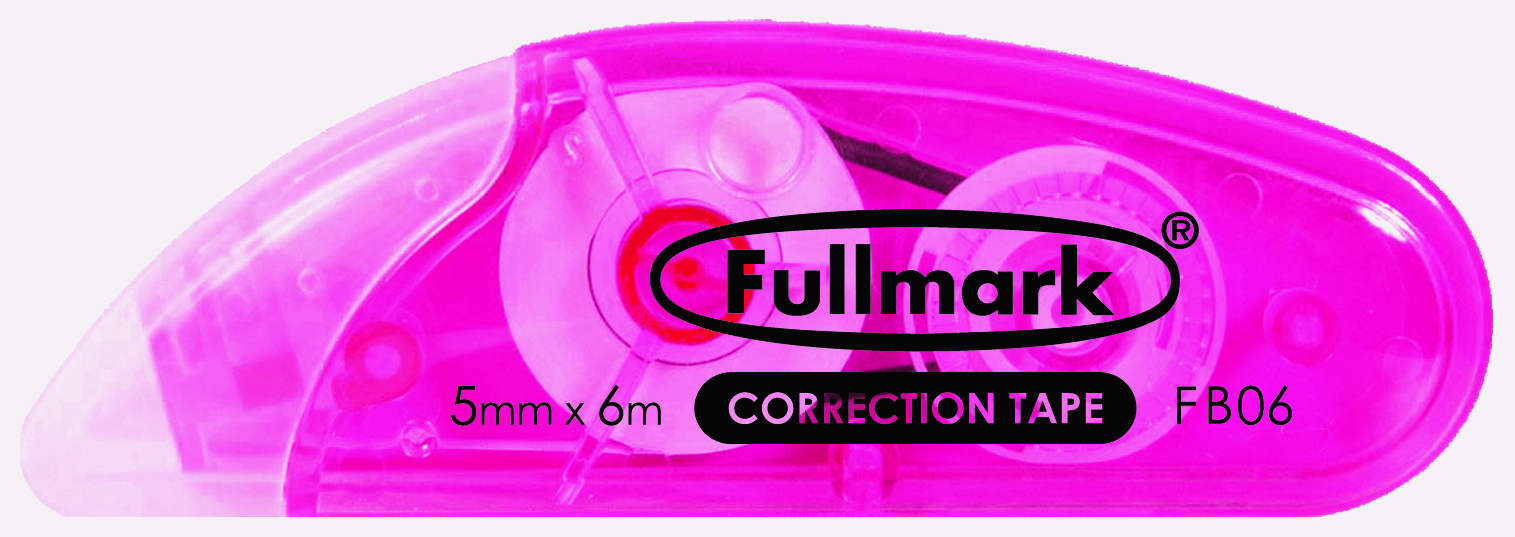
Model B in Pink

Correction tape
Correction tape was invented in 1989 by the Japanese product manufacturer Seed. It is an alternative to correction fluid.

Gel pen
The gel pen was invented in 1984 by the Sakura Color Products Corporation of Osaka.

Rollerball pen
The first rollerball pen was invented in 1963 by the Japanese company Ohto.

== Other ==
Artificial snowflake
The first artificial snowflake was created by Ukichiro Nakaya in 1936, three years after his first attempt.

Canned coffee
Canned coffee was invented in 1965 by Miura Yoshitake, a coffee shop owner in Hamada, Shimane Prefecture, Japan.

Emoji
The first emoji was created in 1998 or 1999 in Japan by Shigetaka Kurita.

Fake food
Simulated food was invented after Japan's surrender ending World War II in 1945. Westerners traveling to Japan had trouble reading Japanese menus and in response, Japanese artisans and candlemakers created wax food so foreigners could easily order something that looked appetizing.

Go, modern rules of
Though the game originated in China, free opening of the game as it is played globally began in the 16th century Japan.

Imageboard
The first imageboards were created in Japan. Later imageboards such as 2chan would be created.

Yoshizawa–Randlett system
The Yoshizawa–Randlett system is a diagramming system used for origami models. It was first developed by Akira Yoshizawa in 1954. It was later improved upon by Samuel Randlett and Robert Harbin.
Textboard
Textboards like imageboards were invented in Japan. However, unlike imageboards, textboards are relatively unknown outside Japan.

== See also ==
- History of science and technology in Japan
- History of typography in East Asia
- List of automotive superlatives – list of first by Japanese cars
- List of Chinese inventions
- List of Chinese discoveries
- List of Korean inventions and discoveries
- List of Taiwanese inventions and discoveries
- Science and technology in Japan
- Ten Japanese Great Inventors
