= Ten Japanese Great Inventors =

1985 celebration of the 100th anniversary of Japan's industrial rights system

The system of industrial rights in Japan celebrated 100 years of existence in 1985. In celebration of the 100th anniversary of the Japanese system of industrial property rights, the Japan Patent Office selected ten great inventors whose contributions were particularly memorable and of historical significance in the industrial development of Japan.

Reliefs of these inventors were created and presented in the lobby of the Japan Patent Office to commemorate their achievements and introduce them to Japanese people.

== The inventors ==
The ten inventors are:

- Sakichi Toyoda Patent Number 1195, Wooden Weaving Machine Driven by Human Power
- Kōkichi Mikimoto Patent Number 2670, Cultured pearl
- Jōkichi Takamine Patent Number 4785, Adrenaline
- Kikunae Ikeda Patent Number 14805, Sodium Glutamate
- Umetaro Suzuki Patent Number 20785, Vitamin B1
- Kyota Sugimoto Patent Number 27877, Japanese typewriter
- Kotaro Honda Patent Number 32234, KS Steel
- Hidetsugu Yagi Patent Number 69115, Yagi Antenna
- Yasujiro Niwa Patent Number 84722, Phototelegraphic Method
- Tokushichi Mishima Patent Number 96371, MKM steel

== See also ==
- List of inventors
- List of Japanese inventions
