= Aichi (disambiguation) =

Aichi Prefecture is a prefecture of Japan in the Chūbu region.

Aichi or Aiti may also refer to:

== Places ==
- Aichi District, Aichi, district in Aichi Prefecture, Japan
- Aichi, Iran, a village in Kurdistan Province, Iran
- Aiti, a commune in France

== Organizations and companies ==
- Aichi Kokuki, Japanese aircraft manufacturing company
- Aichi Steel, Japanese steel manufacturing company
- Aiways (pinyin: Aìchí), a Chinese electric car manufacturer

== Other uses ==
- Aichi (surname)
- Aichi Sendou, protagonist of the media franchise Cardfight!! Vanguard
- 5908 Aichi, main-belt asteroid
