= KS Steel =

Kichizaemon Sumitomo permanent magnetic steel

KS Steel is a permanent magnetic steel with three times the magnetic reluctance of tungsten steel, which was developed in 1917 by the Japanese scientist and inventor Kotaro Honda. "KS" stands for Kichizaemon Sumitomo, the head of the family-run conglomerate, who provided financial support for the research leading to KS Steel's invention. Honda would go on to invent NKS steel in 1933 whose magnetic resistance is several times higher than that of KS Steel.

== History ==
After World War one, when Japan had to cope with painful restrictions on imports of materials from foreign countries such as Germany, physicist Kotaro Honda was motivated to study alloys due to the need of a domestic steel production. He opened up his RIKEN-Honda Laboratory at Tohoku Imperial University in 1922 after he invented KS steel in 1917; it is a permanent magnetic steel with three times the magnetic resistance of tungsten steel. The initials KS in the name of the steel come from Kichizaemon Sumitomo, who was the head of the family that provided financial support for the research leading to the invention.

== Material properties ==
The composition of KS steel is 0.4–0.8 percent carbon; 30–40 percent cobalt; 5–9 percent tungsten; and 1.5–3 percent chromium. KS steel is best tempered when heated to 950 °C and then quenched in heavy oil. The residual magnetism is reduced by only 6 percent when artificially aged. The yield strength of KS steel is above 500 and tensile strength is above 620 and elongation is above 14. The maximum energy product (BH)max of KS steel is 30 kJ/m^3.

== See also ==
- MKM steel
- RIKEN
- Ten Japanese Great Inventors
