= Kotaro Honda =

Japanese scientist and inventor

- 本多 光太郎
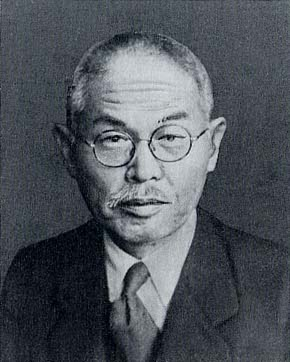
- Kotaro Honda
- Born: February 23, 1870; Okazaki, Aichi, Japan
- Died: February 12, 1954 (aged 83); Tokyo, Japan
- Resting place: Okazaki, Aichi, Japan
- Education: University of Tokyo
- Known for: KS steel

Kotaro Honda (本多 光太郎, Honda Kōtarō), born on February 23, 1870, in Okazaki, Aichi Prefecture – February 12, 1954) was a Japanese metallurgist and inventor. He invented KS steel (initials from Kichiei Sumitomo), which is a type of magnetic resistant steel that is three times more resistant than tungsten steel. This material, which had 250 oersteds magnetic resistance, was developed through rigorous basic research on steel and alloys.

Honda was born in the town of Yahagi (part of modern Okazaki, Aichi and was a graduate of Tokyo Imperial University. He was taught by the famous Japanese physicist Hantaro Nagaoka at the University of Tokyo.

Honda's research on KS steel in 1917, and on improved KS steel in 1934 became the basis for his position that Japan's industrial development is dependent on basic research in major scientific fields. He later improved upon the steel, creating NKS steel. NKS steel was mentioned by Taiichi Ohno in his book as being one of the Japanese materials whose development was tied to World War II.

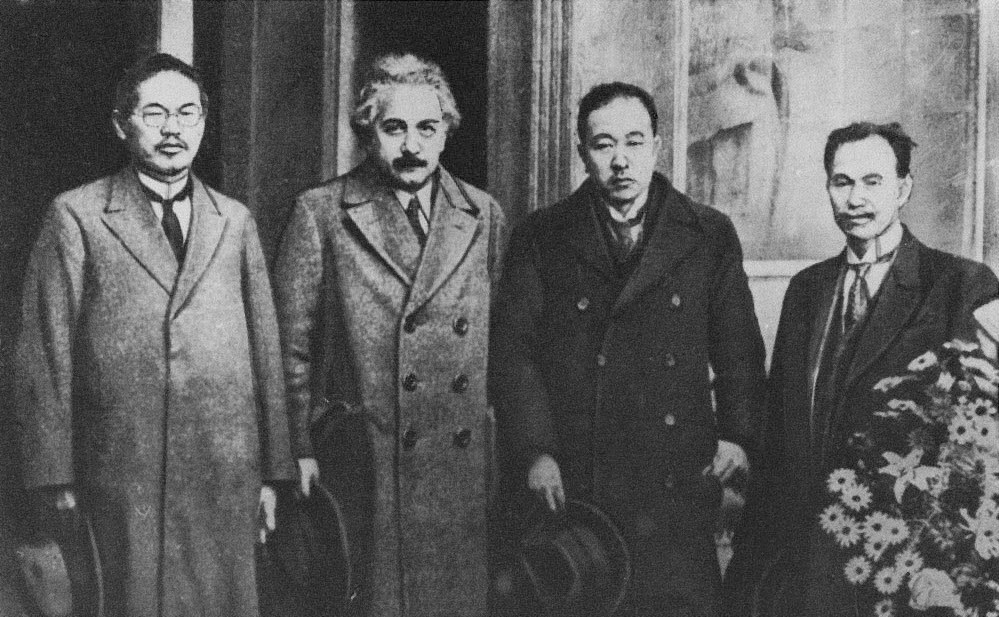
Kotaro Honda, Albert Einstein, Keiichi Aichi and Shirota Kusakabe on the occasion of Einstein's 1922 visit to Tohoku University

Honda, together with the academic Tokiatsu Hojo, setup up a research institute, which was supported by the Sumitomo family. It was later renamed Metallic Materials Research Institute. In 1931, he was appointed president of Tohoku Imperial University, where he taught physics for several years.

He participated in establishing the (千葉工業大学, Chiba Institute of Technology) from 1940. He served as the first president of the Tokyo University of Science from 1949.

Honda was nominated for the Nobel Prize in Physics in 1932, and was one of the first persons to be awarded the Order of Culture when it was established in 1937. He was also awarded the Franklin Institute's Elliott Cresson Medal in 1931 and became a Person of Cultural Merit in 1951. He was posthumously awarded the Grand Cordon of the Order of the Rising Sun.

Honda died in 1954 in Bunkyo, Tokyo, and his grave is at the temple of Myogen-ji in Okazaki.

On April 18, 1985, the Japan Patent Office selected him as one of Ten Japanese Great Inventors.

== Books available in English ==
- Magnetic properties of matter / Kotaro Honda (1928)
