= Seiichi Miyake =

Japanese inventor

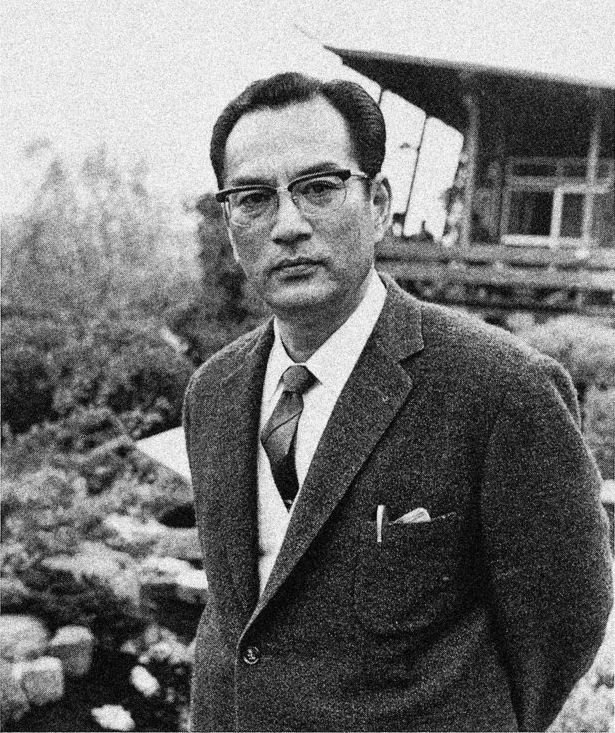
- Seiichi Miyake
- Born: February 5, 1926; Kurashiki, Japan
- Died: July 10, 1982 (aged 56); Okayama, Japan
- Other names: Buraindokurosu (ブラインドクロス; lit. "blind cross")
- Known for: Tactile paving

Seiichi Miyake (Japanese: 三宅 精一, Hepburn: Miyake Seiichi; 5 February 1926 – 10 July 1982) was a Japanese engineer and inventor best known for his work on tactile paving (or "Tenji bricks", "Tactile bricks/blocks") to aid the visually impaired at traffic crossings. Miyake's system of tactile paving was first introduced at a school for the blind in Okayama City on 18 March 1967, and has since been adopted around the world.

== Early life ==
Seiichi Miyake was born on 5 February 1926 in Kurashiki, Okayama Prefecture.

== Inventing tactile bricks ==
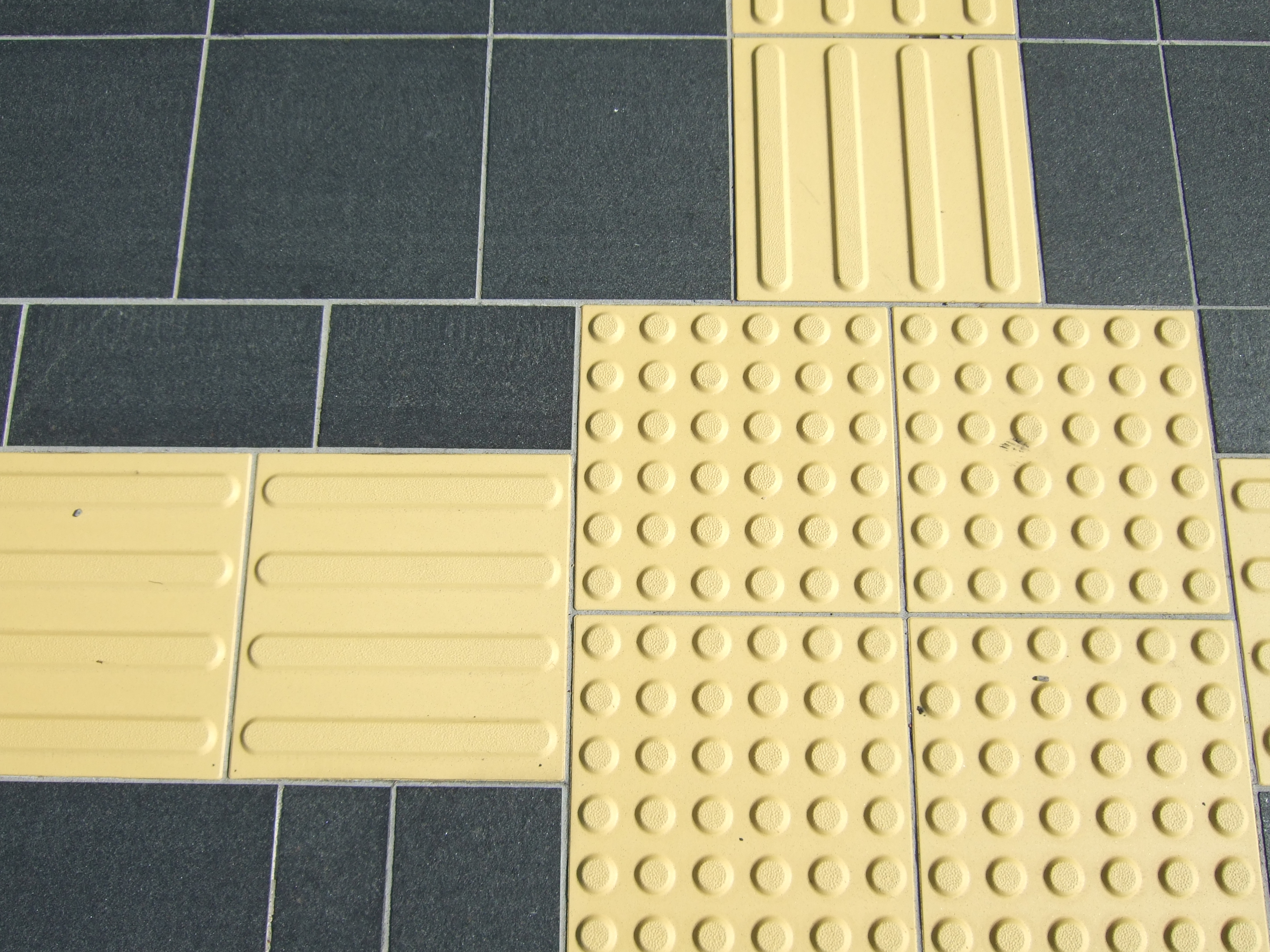
Example of tactile bricks with dots and bars in Japan

In 1965, Seiichi Miyake used his own money to create tactile bricks, which have patterns of raised shapes on their surfaces that can be detected by touch. He invented the blocks to help a friend who was starting to have visual impairment. These patterns indicate different safety or hazard conditions, such as raised dots or blisters for "caution", or long parallel strips for "safe to move ahead". They were also used to identify the boundary between footpath and the road. There are generally two predominant types, namely, the bricks with dots and bricks with bars. The former alerts the visually impaired of danger while the bars provide directional cues. However, "the paths have been constructed inconsistently," in different times and places.

Tactile pavement surfaces were first introduced for pedestrian crossing in streets in 1965 by the Japanese engineer Seiichi Miyake. A regular pattern of flattened domes, cones or blisters are introduced in the paving at the edge of the footpath and the road.

Two years later, on 18 March 1967, Okayama City (western Japan) was the first place to install this invention for visually impaired people. The bricks' bright color is visible to people with low vision and cognitive impairments.

Ten years later, thanks to its safety and navigation benefits, the use of tactile bricks became mandatory in the Japan National Railway. By 1985, it was mandated for broader use in Japan.

== Honours ==
In 2010, the Okayama Prefectural Association for the Visually Impaired registered March 18 as the Day of the Tenji Block with the Japan Anniversary Association. A monument for the Tenji Block birthplace was unveiled at the Harojima intersection in Naka Ward with a theme song, "Shiawase no kiiroi michi" (Yellow road of happiness).

On 18 March 2019, Google Doodle honoured him by creating a short animation of a person with a probing cane being moved over tactile bricks.

== See also ==
- Universal design
- Braille
- Japanese Inventions
