= Aichi (surname) =

Aichi (written: 愛知) is a Japanese surname. Notable people with the surname include:

- Jiro Aichi (愛知 治郎, born 1969), Japanese politician
- Kazuo Aichi (愛知 和男, born 1937), Japanese politician
- Keiichi Aichi (愛知 敬一, 1880–1923), Japanese physicist
- Kiichi Aichi (愛知 揆一, 1907–1973), Japanese politician
