= Kyota Sugimoto =

Japanese inventor

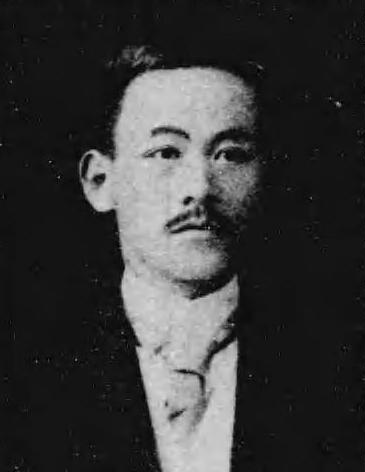
Kyota Sugimoto

Kyota Sugimoto (杉本 京太, Sugimoto Kyōta; September 20, 1882 – December 26, 1972) was a Japanese inventor who developed the first practical Japanese typewriter. He received the Blue Ribbon Award and the Small Asahi Ribbon. Out of the thousands of kanji characters, Sugimoto's typewriter used 2,400 of them.

== Biography ==
Kyota Sugimoto was born in Okayama Prefecture in 1882. He completed his studies at the Training Institute for Communication Technology in Osaka in 1900. Typewriters were already in common use for English and other languages with small alphabets, but available typewriters for kanji could only type a few of the thousands of characters. Sugimoto studied the frequency of use of kanji characters, and selected 2,400 of them for a typewriter. The characters were arranged in a grid, with a typebar that could move over the grid in two dimensions to select a particular character. The typebar then struck the character against the paper, and returned it to the grid. The paper was held against a platen, similar to existing typewriters.

He obtained the patent rights to the Japanese typewriter that he invented, first in Japan (1915, Patent N° 27877) and somewhat later in the USA (1917, Patent N° 1245633).

In 1953 he was decorated with the Blue Ribbon Award, and in 1965 he received the Small Asahi Ribbon Award. He died in 1972.

On April 18, 1985, the Japan Patent Office selected him as one of Ten Japanese Great Inventors.
