= Hidetsugu Yagi =

Japanese electrical engineer

- 八木 秀次
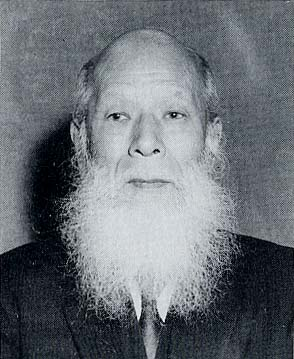
- Born: January 28, 1886; Osaka, Osaka Prefecture, Empire of Japan
- Died: January 19, 1976 (aged 89)
- Education: Tokyo Imperial University
- Occupation: Engineering scientist
- Known for: Yagi–Uda antenna
- Awards: Blue Ribbon Award (1951), the Order of Culture (1956) and the Order of the Rising Sun, First Class (1976)
- Scientific career
- Fields: Electrical engineering

Hidetsugu Yagi (八木 秀次, Yagi Hidetsugu; January 28, 1886 – January 19, 1976) was a Japanese electrical engineer from Osaka, Japan. When working at Tohoku Imperial University, he wrote several articles that introduced a new antenna designed by his assistant Shintaro Uda to the English-speaking world.

The Yagi-Uda antenna, patented in 1926, allows directional transmission using radio waves, and is especially useful in the very high frequency and ultra high frequency radio bands. Antennas of this type were widely used for television and radio reception, and are still common in communication and radar systems. Yagi also tried, unsuccessfully, to introduce a wireless power transmission system. He participated in establishing the Chiba Institute of Technology. He was the fourth president of Osaka University from February 1946 to December 1946.

In 1942, he became the President of Tokyo Institute of Technology, in 1944 he became the President of the Technical Institution, and in 1946 also the President of the Osaka Imperial University. He was decorated with the Medal of Honor with Blue Ribbon Award in 1951, with the Order of Culture in 1956, and posthumously with the Grand Cordon of the Order of the Rising Sun in 1976.

== Biography ==
Hidetsugu Yagi was born on January 28, 1886, in Osaka Prefecture. He graduated from the Department of Electronic Engineering of the Tokyo Imperial University, Faculty of Sciences, in 1909. From 1913 he studied in Germany where he worked with Heinrich Barkhausen on generating CW oscillations by electric arcs; England where he worked with J.A. Fleming who invented the vacuum diode; and the United States where he worked with G. W. Pierce at Harvard who invented the Pierce oscillator which generated a continuous wave. He earned his doctorate from Tokyo Imperial University in 1921. In Germany he continued research on generation of electric waves used for wireless communication. He returned to Japan in 1930. After 1930, Hidetsugu Yagi was involved, as a adviser, in the operation of the Number Nine Research Laboratory run by Iwakuro Hideo.

== Wireless communication ==
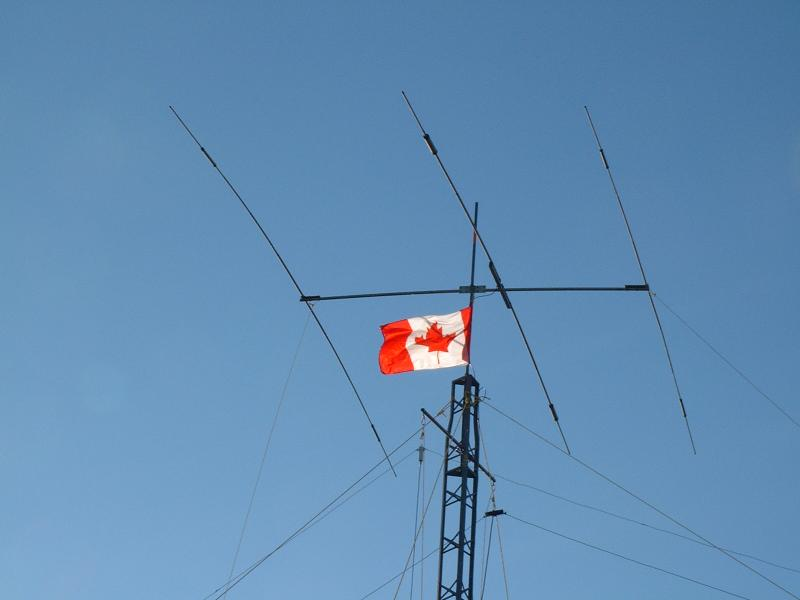
A three-element Yagi–Uda antenna used for amateur radio. The longer reflector element (left), the driven element (center), and the shorter director (right) each have a so-called trap (parallel LC circuit) inserted along their conductors on each side, allowing the antenna to be used at two different frequency bands.

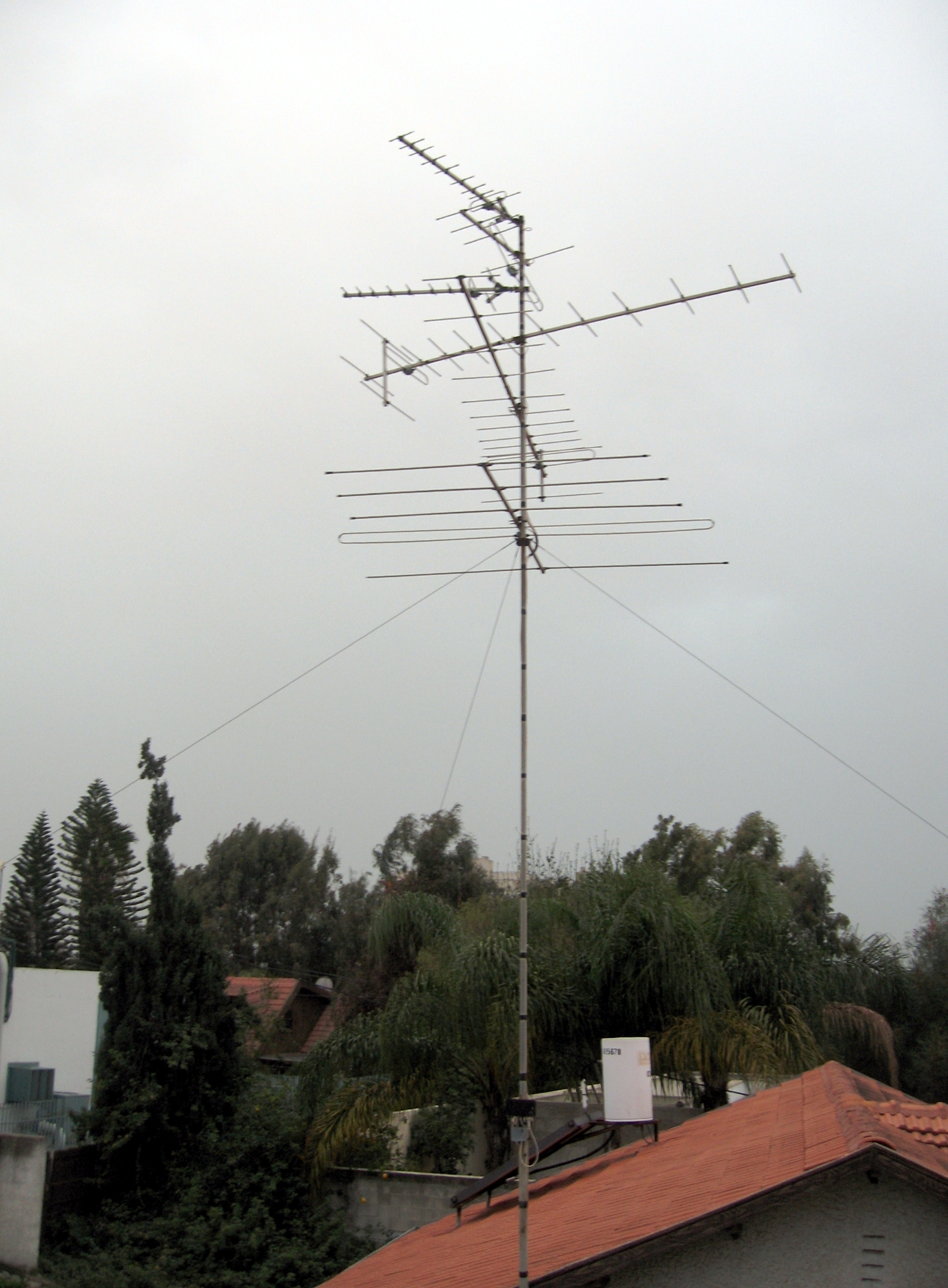
Six rooftop Yagi–Uda television antennas in Israel. The Yagi–Uda design is widely used at VHF and UHF frequencies, since at these wavelengths, the lengths of the elements are conveniently small.

The topic of wireless communication, which he pursued during his studies abroad, would become a research theme to which he would dedicate his entire life. In 1919, he became a professor at the Faculty of Engineering Sciences of the Tohoku Imperial University which was then established and during the same year, he also attained the title of Doctor of Engineering. He was able to foresee that short waves or ultra-short waves would become the main element for communication using radio waves and he aimed his research in this direction. This resulted in the publication of his papers called "Generation of Short Wavelength Waves", "Measuring Specific Wavelengths with Short Wavelengths", and other papers. The so-called Yagi antenna is based on these published articles. He invented it as an antenna using his "method for directional electric waves". He obtained the patent rights to his invention (patent number 69115, issued in 1926).

Because this invention uses a very simple construction, it enabled directional communication with electric waves. This construction is still used basically in any type of antenna which is used today for ultra short or extremely short waves.

On April 18, 1985, the Japan Patent Office selected him as one of Ten Japanese Great Inventors.

On January 28, 2016, Google published an animated Google Doodle to honor his work.
