= Tokushichi Mishima =

Japanese metallurgist

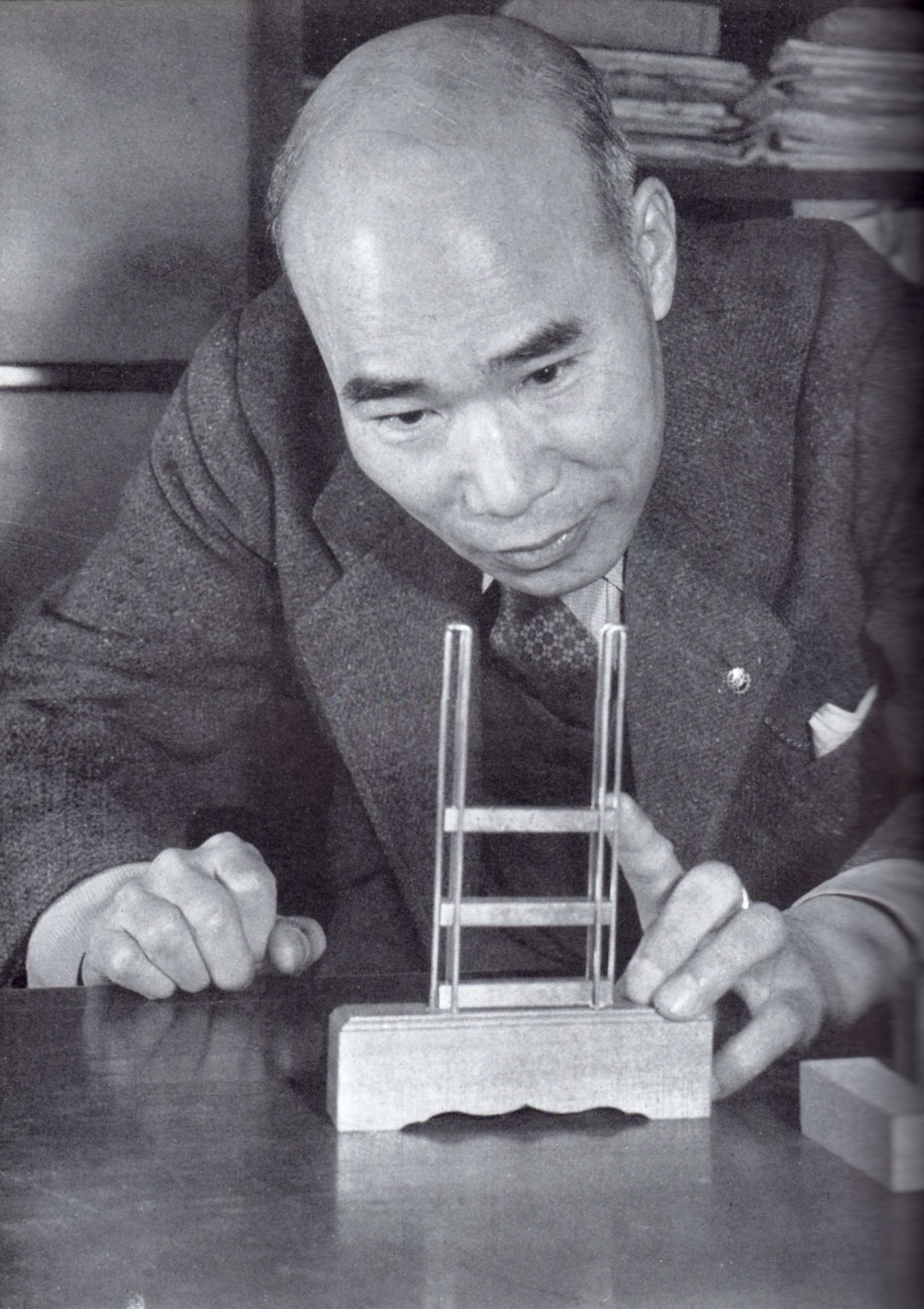
- Born: February 24, 1893; Japan Tsuna District, Hyōgo
- Died: November 19, 1975 (aged 82); Tokyo
- Education: Tokyo Imperial University
- Known for: MKM steel
- Scientific career
- Fields: metallurgy
- Workplaces: Tokyo Imperial University

Tokushichi Mishima (三島 徳七, Mishima Tokushichi; February 24, 1893 – November 19, 1975) was a Japanese metallurgist and inventor. He discovered that aluminum restored magnetism to non-magnetic nickel steel. He invented MKM steel, which was an extremely inexpensive magnetic substance that has been used in many applications. It is also closely related to the modern Alnico magnets. He later became a professor at the Tokyo Imperial University. After his death, his remains were buried in the Tama Cemetery in Tokyo.

== Honours ==
- Award of the Imperial Academy (1945)
- Order of Culture (1950)
- Medal of Honor with Blue Ribbon (1950)
- Grand Cordon of the Order of the Rising Sun (19 November 1975; posthumous)

On April 18, 1985, the Japan Patent Office selected him as one of Ten Japanese Great Inventors.
