= Umetaro Suzuki =

Japanese scientist in vitamin research

- 鈴木 梅太郎
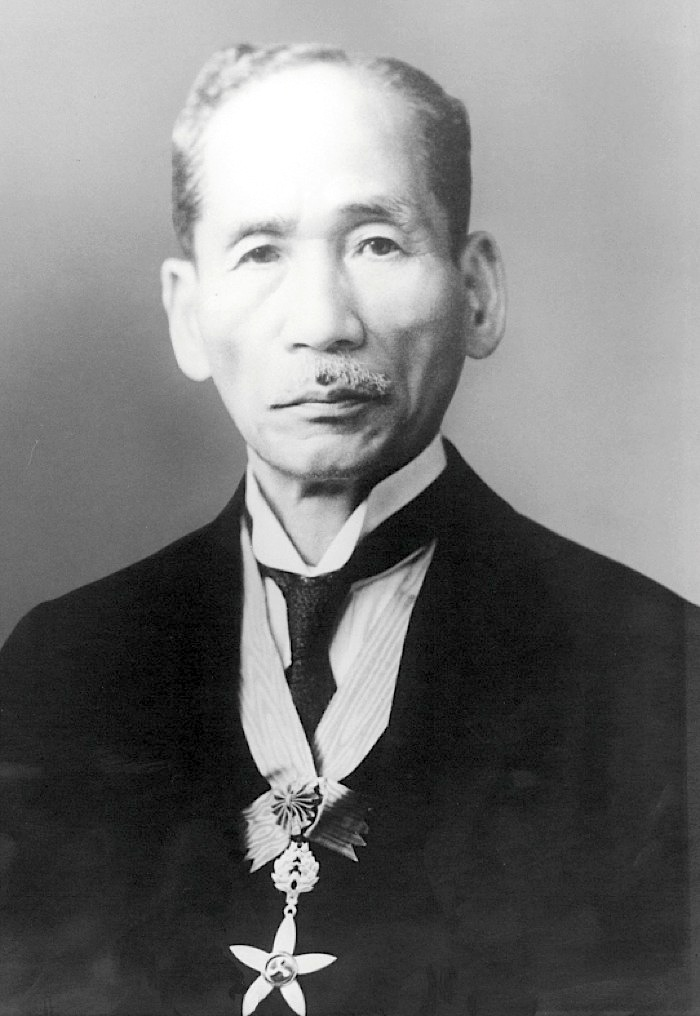
- Born: April 7, 1874; Makinohara, Shizuoka, Japan
- Died: September 20, 1943 (aged 69); Tokyo, Japan
- Citizenship: Japanese
- Known for: Discovery of Vitamin B
- Scientific career
- Fields: Agricultural chemistry

Umetaro Suzuki (鈴木 梅太郎, Suzuki Umetarō, April 7, 1874 – September 20, 1943) was a Japanese scientist, born in what is now part of Makinohara, Shizuoka, Japan. He was a member of the Imperial Academy, and a recipient of the Grand Cordon of the Order of the Sacred Treasure and the Order of Culture. His research was among the earliest of modern vitamin research.

== Biography ==
Suzuki was born as the second son of a farmer in Haibara District, Shizuoka. He was a graduate of one of the predecessors of Tokyo Imperial University and subsequently worked as a research scientist at Riken. In 1901, he studied Peptide synthesis at the Humboldt University of Berlin under Emil Fischer. He returned to Japan in 1906, and accepted a post as professor of agricultural chemistry at Tokyo Imperial University in 1907.

In 1910, Suzuki succeeded in extracting a water-soluble complex of micronutrients from rice bran and named it aberic acid, and which had the effect of curing patients of beriberi. He published this discovery in a Japanese scientific journal.

When the article was translated into German, the translation failed to state that it was a newly discovered nutrient, a claim made in the original Japanese article, and hence his discovery failed to gain publicity. Polish biochemist Kazimierz Funk isolated the same complex of micronutrients and proposed the complex be named "vitamine" (from "vital amine") in 1912. In 1935, this compound was refined and correctly described as thiamine.

On April 18, 1985, the Japan Patent Office selected him as one of Ten Japanese Great Inventors.
