= Keiichi Aichi =

Japanese physicist

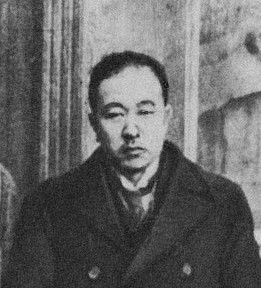
- Born: 25 July 1880; Tokyo, Japan
- Died: 23 June 1923 (aged 42)
- Scientific career
- Fields: Physics

Keiichi Aichi (愛知 敬一, Aichi Keiichi; July 25, 1880 – June 23, 1923) was a Japanese physicist. He served as a professor of the physics department at the College of Science, Tohoku Imperial University.

Aichi was born in Tokyo in 1880 and studied theoretical physics at University of Tokyo. He graduated in 1903 and in 1905 moved to Kyoto where he became an assistant professor at Kyoto University. Between 1908 and 1911 he studied in Germany and in 1912 defended his PhD at Tohoku Imperial University with recommendations from the chancellor. Soon after, he assumed the post of professor at the university's then newly established College of Science. In 1922, he served as an interpreter during the visit of Albert Einstein in Japan. Aichi died from food poisoning in 1923.

His son was the politician Kiichi Aichi, who served consecutively as Minister for Foreign Affairs and Minister of Finance.

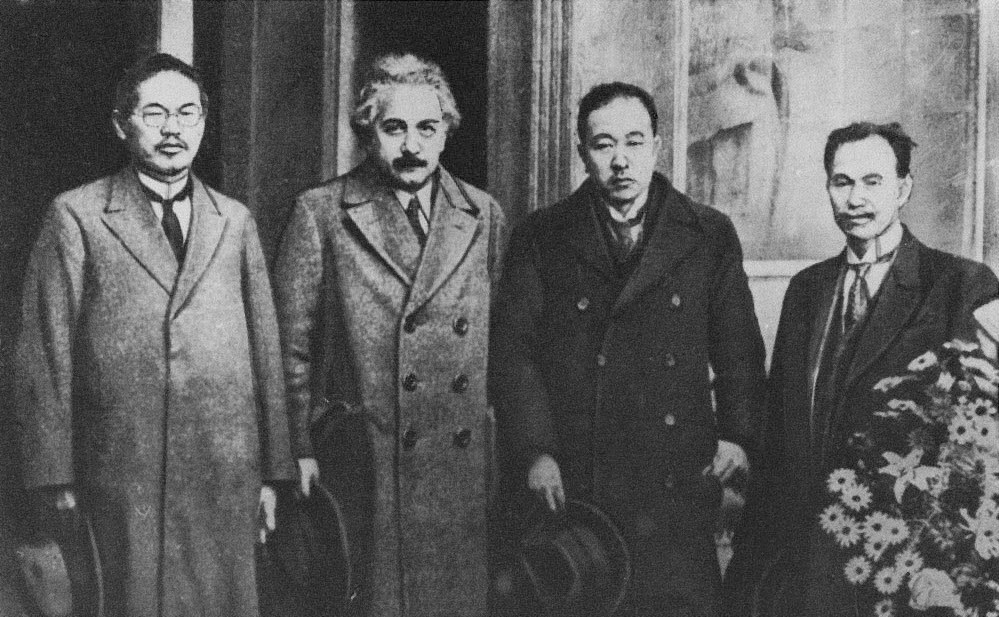
From left to right: Kotaro Honda, Albert Einstein, Keiichi Aichi and Shirota Kusakabe, Tohoku Imperial University, 1922

== Books ==
- Jitsuyō kōtō sūgaku 『実用高等数学』 (co-authored with Takejirō Sumio (角尾 猛次郎, Sumio Takejirō)) Dainippon Tosho, 1909
- Shizen no bi to megumi: Kagaku sōwa 『自然の美と恵—科学叢話』 (Beauty and grace of nature: Science stories) Maruzen, 1917
- Rikigaku 『力学』 (Mechanics) Shōkabō, 1919
- Hōshanō gairon 『放射能概論』 (Introduction to Radiation) Maruzen, 1920
- Denkigaku no taito Faradē no den 『電気学の泰斗ファラデーの伝』 (Story of Faraday – the father of electricity) Iwanami Shoten, 1922
- Denshi no jijoden: Tsūzoku denki kōwa 『電子の自叙伝—通俗電気講話』 Shōkabō, 1922
- Rironbutsurigaku 『理論物理学』 (Theoretical Physics) Shōkabō, 1924

=== Translations ===
- Carl Friedrich Gauss' Theory of Potential 「ポテンチヤル論」 (co-translated with Junzō Ōkubo (大久保 準三, Ōkubo Junzō), Tohoku Imperial University Edition Kagaku meichoshū 『科学名著集』 4, Maruzen, 1913
