= Tungsten steel =

Steel Alloy

Tungsten steel is any steel that has tungsten as its alloying element with characteristics derived mostly from the presence of this element (as opposed to any other element in the alloy). Common alloys have between 2% and 18% tungsten by weight along with small amounts of molybdenum and vanadium which together create an alloy with exceptional heat, corrosion, and wear resistance. Tungsten is one of the oldest elements used for alloying steel. It forms a very hard carbide and an Fe–W intermetallic phase. High tungsten content in the alloy, however, tends to cause brittleness and makes it subject to fracturing rather than bending. The SAE designation for all tungsten steels consist of four numbers beginning with the number 7, in the format 7XXX.

Tungsten steel is used for manufacturing micro-drill bits, high-durability self-sharpening rotary cutting blades, and rocket engine nozzles, among many other applications.
