= Japanese typewriter =

Typewriter used to produce Japanese script

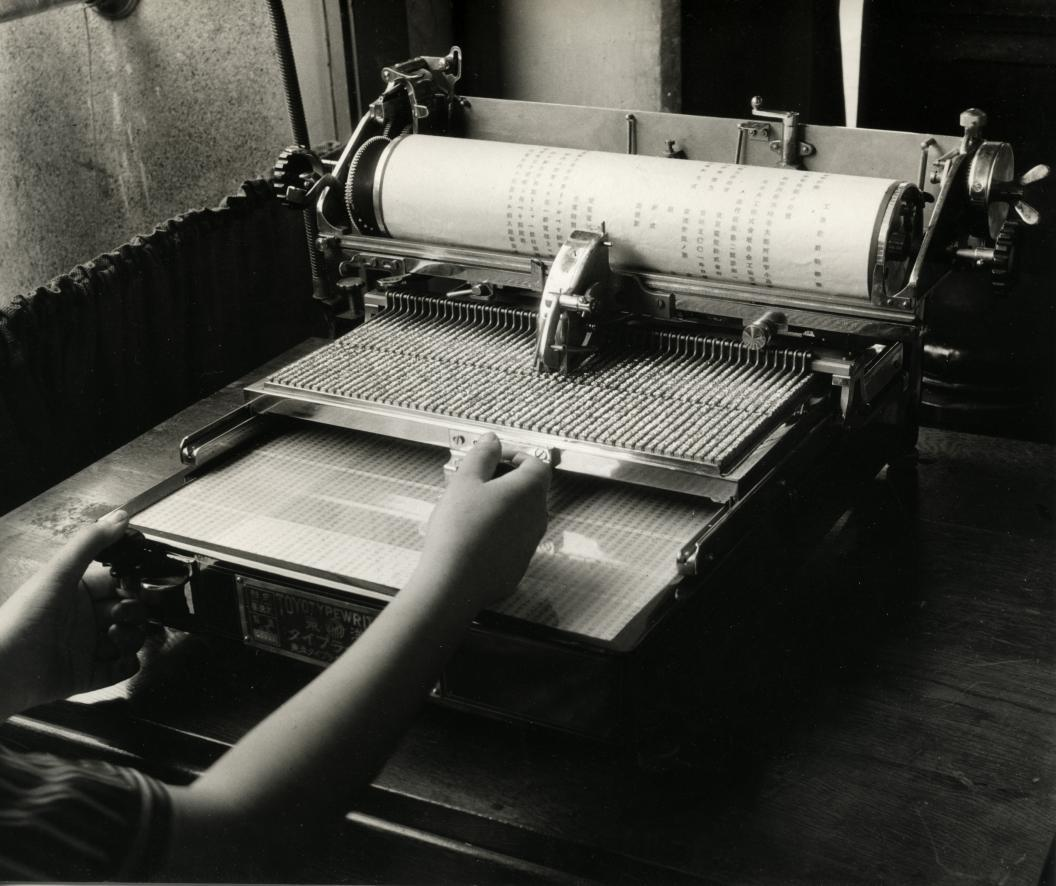
A typist uses a Japanese typewriter

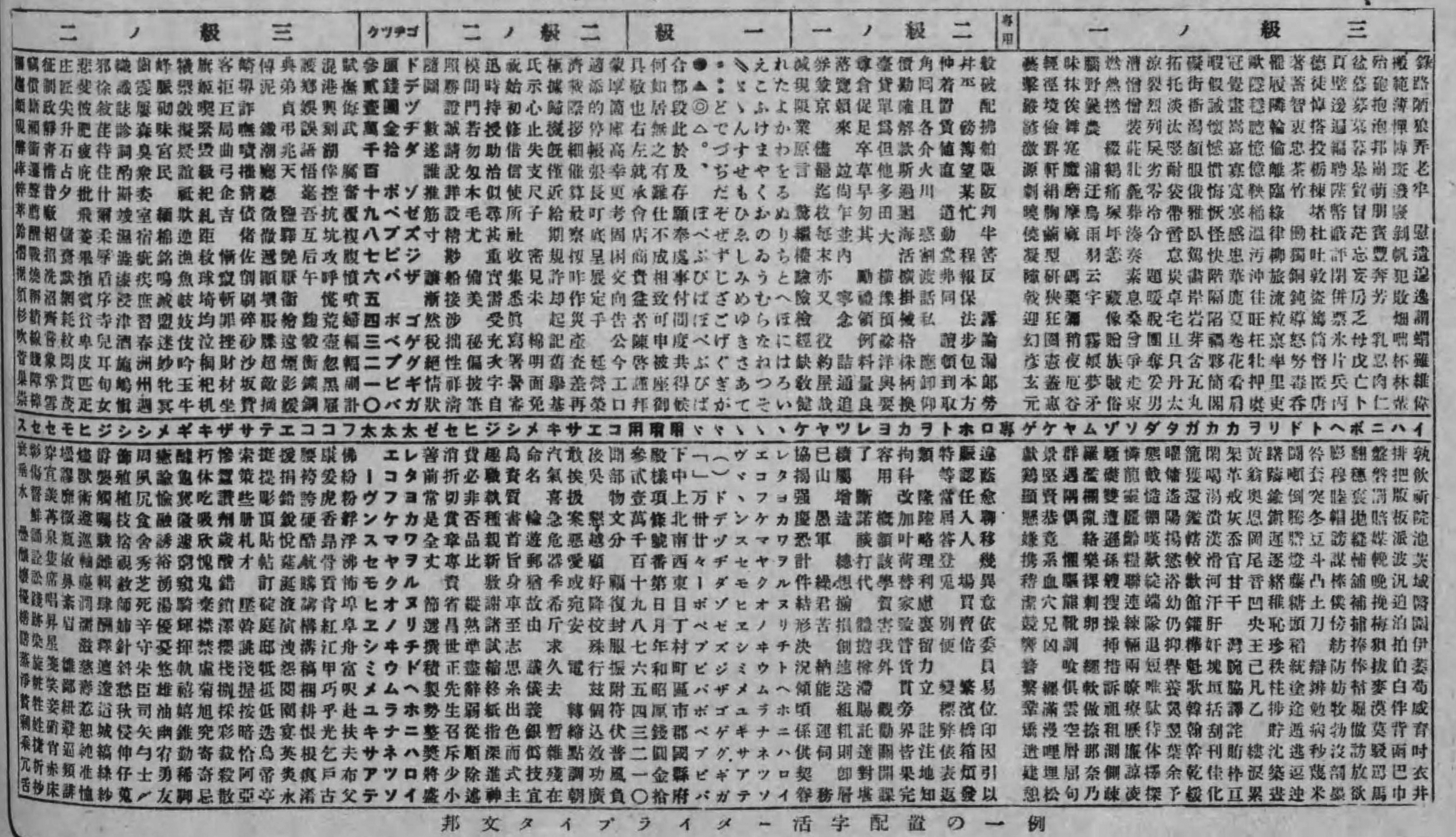
An example of the arrangement of characters for a Japanese typewriter (1935), arranged in Iroha order. Kanji are arranged based on their on'yomi.

The first practical Japanese typewriter (Japanese: 和文タイプライター, Hepburn: wabun taipuraitā) was invented by Kyota Sugimoto in 1915. Out of the thousands of kanji characters, Kyota's original typewriter used 2,400 of them. He obtained the patent rights to the typewriter that he invented in 1929. Sugimoto's typewriter met its competition when the Oriental Typewriter was invented by Shimada Minokichi. The Otani Japanese Typewriter Company and Toshiba also later released their own typewriters.

== Structure ==
Unlike a Western typewriter, Japanese typewriter had no keyboard or arms with type slugs attached. Instead, it consisted of:

- Bucket unit filled with type slugs that can slide up, down, left, and right,
- Pickup mechanism that mechanically extracts a type slug from the bucket and strikes it onto the paper through an ink ribbon,
- Layout board—a printed label showing the arrangement of characters corresponding to those stored in the bucket beneath the fixed pickup,
- Finder, fixed to the bucket, which indicates the only character that can currently be picked up, (By moving the finder vertically or horizontally, the bucket itself moves accordingly.)
- And a trigger button to operate the pickup.

Because the number of characters required to write Japanese is vastly larger than the alphabet used for European languages, simply extending the "one key per character" concept of Western typewriters would have made the mechanism overly complex and impractical. Sugimoto therefore adopted a new approach and invented a system in which characters could be selected from a type box by manipulating a control panel with keys.

== Operation and applications ==
The machine contained over 1,000 characters at minimum, and in most general-purpose models more than 2,000 kanji. Because the operator had to search for and strike each appropriate character one by one from this vast assortment of type slugs, a high degree of skill was required.

The Japanese typewriter was used strictly for producing fair copies of documents. Drafts produced with the machine were often used by printers for phototypesetting, or printed through cyanotype, and later with photocopiers. From 1930, the Japanese Linotype machine was also developed, and for many years both technologies supported the preparation of documents in Japanese government offices as well as layout production in the printing industry. Especially in document preparation, thanks to the spread of general-purpose models, the Japanese typewriter proved highly effective in schools, public institutions, and corporations for creating documents and notices distributed internally and externally. Before the 1970s, alongside mimeograph duplication of handwritten manuscripts, it had secured a certain status as an indispensable office tool.

== Decline and difficulties ==
However, the Japanese typewriter was bulky and laborious to use. Unlike the Western typewriter, which allows the typist to key in text quickly, one needed to locate and then retrieve the desired character from a large matrix of metal characters. For instance, to type a sentence, the typist would need to find and retrieve around 22 symbols from about three different character matrices, making the sentence longer to type than its romanized version. For this reason, typists were required to undergo specialized training, and typing documents was not part of the duties of the ordinary office worker.

Correcting typing errors afterward was extremely difficult. If the machine were tipped over, the type slugs inside the bucket would scatter everywhere, and merely reassembling them required the expertise of a specialist. In addition to being inconvenient to transport, the machine produced a loud operating noise, and it gradually disappeared from use as Japanese word processors became widespread from around 1980.

== Type layout ==
The character layout of the Japanese typewriter, including in cases where it was used for certification, was generally arranged according to the on'yomi (Sino-Japanese readings) of kanji in gojūon order, as it is the standard syllabary sequence of Japanese. However, in the Japan Self-Defense Forces the traditional iroha order was used. In 1968, the Japan Ground Self-Defense Force accepted female non-commissioned officers as typists in its document division and conducted certification tests within the force. Because the type layout differed from that used in civilian settings, these typists found it difficult to obtain recognized qualifications when seeking reemployment in the private sector after retirement. After the machine was abolished in the 1980s, measures were introduced to transfer retiring personnel, except for those leaving at the end of their terms, to non-combat specialties.

== Transition and electronic successors ==
Although the Japanese typewriter gradually vanished during the 1980s with the rapid spread and falling price of word processors, one transitional model appeared in 1980. That year, Oki Electric Industry released the Lettermate 80, an electronicized version of the Japanese typewriter, marketed as a "Japanese Electronic Typewriter". Priced at 1.85 million yen at the time (approximately USD 8,200 at the exchange rate at the time), the device was actually cheaper—about one-third to three-fifths the cost—than Japanese word processors, which were still in their infancy. It used a Japanese typewriter keyboard as the input device, allowing the user to select characters by touching them with a special pen connected to the main unit by cable. Furthermore, by saving the inputted text as data on mini floppy disks (5-inch disks, as opposed to the 8-inch standard of the day), the machine enabled proofreading—a task that conventional Japanese typewriters had been ill-suited for.

== See also ==
- Chinese typewriter
- Japanese input method – Methods used to input Japanese characters on a computer
