= MKM steel =

Magnetic steel alloy

MKM steel, an alloy containing nickel and aluminum, was developed in 1931 by metallurgist Tokushichi Mishima (三島徳七). While conducting research into the properties of nickel, Mishima discovered that a strongly magnetic steel could be created by adding aluminum to non-magnetic nickel steel.

== Characteristics ==
The developers claim MKM steel is tough and durable, inexpensive to produce, maintains strong magnetism when miniaturized and can produce a stable magnetic force in spite of temperature changes or vibration. MKM steel is similar to Alnico.

== Acronym ==
MKM is an acronym for Mishima Kizumi Magnetic, 'Kizumi (喜住)' being the inventor's childhood surname.
