= History of science and technology in Japan =

This article is about the history of science and technology in modern Japan.

== Science ==
In the natural sciences, the number of Japanese winners of the Nobel Prize has been second only to the United States in the 21st century, for contributions made in the 20th century. On the list of countries by research and development spending, Japan is third on the list, behind the United States and China.

=== Chemistry ===
==== Frontier Molecular Orbital Theory ====
In 1952, Kenichi Fukui published a paper in the Journal of Chemical Physics titled "A molecular theory of reactivity in aromatic hydrocarbons." He later received the 1981 Nobel Prize in Chemistry for his investigations into the mechanisms of chemical reactions, with his prize-winning work focused on the role of frontier orbitals in chemical reactions, specifically that molecules share loosely bonded electrons which occupy the frontier orbitals, that is the Highest Occupied Molecular Orbital (HOMO) and the Lowest Unoccupied Molecular Orbital (LUMO).

==== Chirally catalyzed hydrogenation ====
Ryōji Noyori was awarded the 2001 Nobel Prize in Chemistry for his "work on chirally catalyzed hydrogenation reactions" in 1968.

==== Proteins and enzymes ====
In the 1960s and 1970s, green fluorescent proteins (GFP), along with the separate luminescent protein aequorin (an enzyme that catalyzes the breakdown of luciferin, releasing light), was first purified from Aequorea victoria and its properties studied by Osamu Shimomura. He was awarded the 2008 Nobel Prize in Chemistry "for the discovery and development of the green fluorescent protein, GFP".

Koichi Tanaka was awarded the 2003 Nobel Prize in Chemistry for the development of soft laser desorption, "methods for identification and structure analyses of biological macromolecules" and for "soft desorption ionisation methods for mass spectrometric analyses of biological macromolecules". In 1987, he demonstrated that laser pulses could blast apart large protein molecules so that ions in gaseous form are produced.

==== Conductive polymers ====
Hideki Shirakawa was awarded the 2000 Nobel Prize in Chemistry "for the discovery and development of conductive polymers".

=== Mathematics ===
In the 1930s, while studying switching circuits, NEC engineer Akira Nakashima independently discovered Boolean algebra, which he was unaware of until 1938. In a series of papers published from 1934 to 1936, he formulated a two-valued Boolean algebra as a way to analyze and design circuits by algebraic means in terms of logic gates.

=== Medicine ===
In a landmark series of experiments beginning in 1976, Susumu Tonegawa showed that genetic material can rearrange itself to form the vast array of available antibodies. He later received the 1987 Nobel Prize in Physiology or Medicine "for his discovery of the genetic principle for generation of antibody diversity."

=== Physics ===
==== Particle physics ====
Hideki Yukawa predicted the existence of mesons in 1934, for which he later received the 1949 Nobel Prize in Physics. Yoichiro Nambu was awarded the 2008 Nobel Prize in Physics for his 1960 discovery of the mechanism of spontaneous broken symmetry in subatomic physics, related at first to the strong interaction's chiral symmetry (chiral symmetry breaking) and later to the electroweak interaction and Higgs mechanism.

The bottom quark is a product in almost all top quark decays, and is a frequent decay product for the Higgs boson. The bottom quark was theorized in 1973 by physicists Makoto Kobayashi and Toshihide Maskawa to explain CP violation. Toshihide Maskawa and Makoto Kobayashi's 1973 article, "CP Violation in the Renormalizable Theory of Weak Interaction", is the fourth most cited high energy physics paper of all time as of 2010. They discovered the origin of the explicit breaking of CP symmetry in the weak interactions. The Cabibbo–Kobayashi–Maskawa matrix, which defines the mixing parameters between quarks, was the result of this work. Kobayashi and Maskawa were awarded the 2008 Nobel Prize in Physics "for the discovery of the origin of the broken symmetry which predicts the existence of at least three families of quarks in nature."

==== Quantum physics ====
Leo Esaki was awarded the 1 Nobel Prize in Physics for the discovery of electron tunneling (quantum tunnelling) in the 1950s. The tunnel diode (Esaki diode) was invented in August 1957 by Leo Esaki, Yuriko Kurose and Takashi Suzuki when they were working at Tokyo Tsushin Kogyo, now Sony.

Shin'ichirō Tomonaga was awarded the 1965 Nobel Prize in Physics for his "fundamental work in quantum electrodynamics, with deep-ploughing consequences for the physics of elementary particles".

==== Astrophysics ====
Masatoshi Koshiba was awarded the 2002 Nobel Prize in Physics "for pioneering contributions to astrophysics, in particular for the detection of cosmic neutrinos" in the 1980s. He conducted pioneering work on solar neutrino detection, and Koshiba's work also resulted in the first real-time observation of neutrinos from the SN 1987A supernova. These efforts marked the beginning of neutrino astronomy.

=== Psychology ===
The Rashomon effect is where the same event is given contradictory interpretations by different individuals involved. The concept originates from Akira Kurosawa's 1950 film Rashomon, where a murder is described in four mutually contradictory ways by its four witnesses.

== Technology in the Empire of Japan (1868–1945) ==
For the first twenty years in the Meiji era, patents and inventions failed to attract much public attention. From the time of the Russo-Japanese War, largely through the action of the body known as the Imperial Invention Association, invention has been encouraged by the Government. With the outbreak of the First World War, imported manufactured goods were cut off, as was the inflow of foreign technology, and, as a consequence, a number of new industries, especially in the heavy and chemical sectors, were set up. Existing firms also took advantage of the opportunity for technical development and the penetration of new markets. Several such companies were able to overcome the difficulties posed by economic depression and severe international competition. In 1935, at a time Japan experienced state of the art modernization entitled Shōwa Modan, the country ranked only behind the United States and Germany in the number of patents granted.

=== Agriculture ===
Vertical rice polishing machine

The rice polishing machines used today are based on the vertical power-driven the milling machine, which was invented by Riichi Satake (the founder of Satake Corporation 株式会社サタケ) in 1930. The condition of the rice after milling, the extent of the milling, and damage to the rice grains during the process affects every link in the production chain. Rice could now be polished more efficiently. The abrasive action of the vertical polishing machine reduced the number of broken grains and made polishing more even, making it possible to produce highly polished rice. Unlike the previous horizontal polishing machines, which are used for table rice, the vertical design used gravity to drop the rice through the center chamber, which was outfitted with a center grindstone coated with carborundum. Horizontal polishing machines have the rice grains rub each other, but the vertical Satake type polished the grain with the abrasive center roller to achieve a 40 percent polishing ration, removing 50 percent of the rice grain, revolutionizing the rice milling system and became the standard, resulting in more uniform, finely polished grains that did not chip or crack.

=== Batteries ===
Dry cell

The world's first dry-battery was invented during the Meiji Era. The inventor was Yai Sakizou. The company Yai founded no longer exists. An award was granted for a dry cell battery by Yai at the 1903 Fifth National Industrial Exhibition (第5回内国勧業博覧会) in Osaka, Japan. It seems that his award was given in recognition of the fact that his battery was already being exported to foreign countries.

Reactive lead oxides production method

In 1920 Genzo Shimadzu invents a "reactive lead oxides production method". Genzo's invention of the reactive lead powder manufacturing method in 1920 revolutionized the quality and cost of lead powder used in storage batteries. The manufactured lead powder was also used in anti-rust paints, which was even used on the Tokyo Skytree tower completed in 2012. For that invention, Genzo Jr. was selected as one of Japan's ten greatest inventors. He directed the company's efforts toward the development, independently, of a lead-powder production method, which was subsequently named the 'Production Method for Positive Response Lead Powder.' This was a simple and inexpensive method of industrial production, whereby a lump of lead was placed in a revolving iron drum while air was blown in. The ensuing oxidation of the lump of lead, and its breakdown into lead particles by the friction of the revolving drum, produced the positively charged lead powder. In addition to patenting various processes in Japan, Shimadzu registered patents in the major foreign countries. There were enquiries also concerning the implementation of patents for the Shimadzu production method in the US, Britain, Italy, Belgium, Sweden, Canada, Australia and France, attesting to the strong international interest in this technology. At this point, however, Shimadzu became entangled in a patent dispute in the US. In June 1932, the US Supreme Court pronounced its final verdict and established the patent rights for the Shimadzu technology. Following this victory, implementation of patent rights were finalized in the US, Britain, and France; that is, contracts were concluded successively in these countries. A contract for the acquisition by Ost Lurgi of the Shimadzu technology option was signed in Frankfurt am Main on 1 June 1926. Fritz Haber was also present at this meeting. The company, Ost Lurgi located in Berlin, was established in March 1926 as a joint venture of Mitsubishi, Metallgesellschaft and Degussa AG. The initiator of the establishing Ost Lurgi was Fritz Haber, inventor of the Haber Bosch process, who visited Japan in 1924, he thought highly of the standard of Japanese technology and originated a number of proposals for technico-industrial cooperation between Germany and Japan. One of his idealistic proposals gave rise to the establishment contract of Ost Lurgi. The purpose of Ost Lurgi was to transfer Japanese technology to Germany, but negotiations were drawn out, since the parties could not agree on conditions.

=== Telecommunications ===
Cathode ray tube (CRT)

In 1924, Kenjiro Takayanagi began a research program on electronic television. In 1925, he demonstrated a cathode ray tube (CRT) television with thermal electron emission. In 1926, he demonstrated a CRT television with 40-line resolution, the first working example of a fully electronic television receiver. In 1927, he increased the television resolution to 100 lines, which was unrivaled until 1931. In 1928, he was the first to transmit human faces in half-tones on television, influencing the later work of Vladimir K. Zworykin.

TYK Wireless Telephone

In the era when there was only a Morse code wireless telegraph, the world's first practical "wireless telephone" to send voices wirelessly was invented in 1912, and successfully completed the first telephone call test in Japan. This device was called the "TYK-type wireless telephone" and was the first wireless telephone to be put into practical use in the world, and in 1913 it was installed in Toba and Kamishima, etc. (A remote island about 14 km from Toba) in Mie Prefecture. After a successful call experiment, a public communication service using wireless telephones started in 1916, with more than 15,000 practical calls. Later, the TYK wireless telephone won a foreign patent and contributed to the introduction of Japanese technology overseas. The commendation system of the Imperial Invention Association took effect through various expositions, exhibitions, prize contests and patent conventions. The first recipients were Uichi Torigata, Eitaro Yokoyama, and Sejiro Kitamura for the TYK wireless telephone. on 16 December 1914, the world's first public telephone service via a voice based wireless communications system got underway.

Meteor burst communications

The first observation of interaction between meteors and radio propagation was reported by Hantaro Nagaoka in 1929.

Yagi antenna

The Yagi-Uda antenna was invented in 1926 by Shintaro Uda of Tohoku Imperial University, Sendai, Japan, with the collaboration of Hidetsugu Yagi, also of Tohoku Imperial University. Yagi published the first English-language reference on the antenna in a 1928 survey article on short wave research in Japan and it came to be associated with his name. However, Yagi always acknowledged Uda's principal contribution to the design, and the proper name for the antenna is, as above, the Yagi-Uda antenna (or array).

NE-style phototelegraphy

Phototelegraphic equipment invented by Yasujiro Niwa that became the foundation of mechanical televisions and FAX machines in Japan. In November 1928, when Emperor Hirohito's Imperial Accession Ceremony was held, newspaper companies that had mulled over ways to deliver papers with photos (The first photo-telegraph to be sent using a leased line) of the ceremony throughout the nation as quickly as possible employed this phototelegraphic equipment with great success. In general use, the NEC-style photo-telegraph was used to send information such as pictures and handwriting.

Non-loaded Cable

The vital technology in Japan's effort to build a strategic communications link between the home islands and Manchukuo. The importance of this technological invention was not limited to Manchuria, it was the technological equivalent in Japan's new empire-building endeavor to the gutta-percha submarine cable in the creation of the British Empire. In the meantime, NLC would be heralded as a quintessential "Japanese-style technology" and a milestone in modern Japan's quest for technological autonomy. Even decades later, many in Japan were still convinced that "consistently in every step from invention to application, it was literally a domestically produced technology, worthy of international pride" and the development of NLC was "clearly the starting point of the leap forward of our telecommunications technology to the world's top level". In 1936, the Japanese government adopted non-loaded cable for the new Japan–Manchukuo cable network as well as for the long-distance communications networks in Japan, thus establishing the supremacy of the new technology in Japan. In the same year, Shigeyoshi Matsumae (松前重義 1901–1991) was awarded the Asano Prize by Japan's Association of Electrical Engineering for his ground-breaking contribution to the development of telecommunications technology. Named after one of Japan's first electrical engineers, who oversaw the laying of the submarine cable to Taiwan, the prize of 1,000 yen further consolidated the reputation of NLC as well as that of its chief inventor. Later that year, Matsumae received his doctoral degree from Tōhoku Imperial University. the NLC technology was "the greatest invention in Japan's telecommunications industry". Now recognized as Japan's unique contribution to the field of telephone transmission.

=== Electronics ===
Digital circuits

From 1934 to 1936, NEC engineer Akira Nakashima introduced switching circuit theory in a series of papers showing that two-valued Boolean algebra, which he discovered independently, can describe the operation of switching circuits. Nakashima's switching circuit theory used digital electronics for Boolean algebraic operations. Nakashima's work was later cited and elaborated on in Claude Shannon's seminal 1938 paper "A Symbolic Analysis of Relay and Switching Circuits". Nakashima laid the foundations for digital system design with his switching circuit theory, using a form of Boolean algebra as a way to analyze and design circuits by algebraic means in terms of logic gates. His switching circuit theory provided the mathematical foundations and tools for digital system design in almost all areas of modern technology, and was the basis for digital electronics and computer theory. Nakashima's work on switching circuit theory was further advanced by Claude Shannon in the United States during the late 1930s to 1940s, and by Goto Mochinori in Japan during the 1940s.

Screen grid valve

The first true screen-grid valve, with a screen grid designed for this purpose, was patented by Hiroshi Ando in 1919.

=== Lighting ===
Double-coil bulb

In 1921, Junichi Miura created the first double-coil bulb using a coiled coil tungsten filament while working for Hakunetsusha (a predecessor of Toshiba). At the time, machinery to mass-produce coiled coil filaments did not exist, however Hakunetsusha developed a method to mass-produce coiled coil filaments by 1936.

=== Metallurgy/Materials ===
KS steel

Magnetic resistant steel that is three times more resistant than tungsten steel, invented by Kotaro Honda. Honda's discovery formed an important basis for Japan's world-leading position in this field. Always been interested in magnetism, and after returning from studying at Göttingen University in Germany, he became a professor of Tohoku University in 1911. It was at Tohoku University that he invented cobalt steel. Later, he recalled the way he created this world-class material:

The structure of the alloy (cobalt steel) was basically created in my brain. It was not created merely by chance or by accident. Japanese researchers would do well to learn from my example.

The cobalt steel was named 'KS steel' in Japan, since these were the initials of Sumitomo Kichizaemon, the family head of the Sumitomo zaibatsu, who had donated generous funds for this research. In 1918, Sumitomo Steel Casting succeeded in producing KS steel commercially. This steel, although very expensive, was extremely advanced, and was widely exported to Europe and the United States. In the same year, the Institute of Iron and Steel Research (later known as the Institute of Metal Research), the first public research institute for metals, was founded at Tohoku University, and it became the centre for metal research in Japan.

MKM steel

MKM steel, an alloy containing nickel and aluminum, was developed in 1931 by the Japanese metallurgist Tokushichi Mishima.

BaTiO_{3}

Barium titanate (BaTiO_{3}) was discovered by T. Ogawa in 1943.

Hematite reduction process

The Anshan Iron Works of the South Manchurian Railway company, having an abundant supply of precisely this sort of low-ferrous, non-magnetic, and high-silica iron ore deposits, was looking for a technical breakthrough to exploit these deposits. Umene Tsunesaburo (later the Chief Engineer and Director), a young engineer of the Anshan Works, graduated from the Department of Metallurgy at Kyoto University in 1911 and went to the Yawata Works. In 1916, when the Anshan Works was established as a large integrated mill, Umene made his way into Manchuria. The operation of the first blast furnace (67 000 ton per year) began in 1919. When the post-First World War depression hit the works, however, South Manchuria Railroad Company (SMRC) decided to postpone the opening of Anshan's second blast furnace, and proposed construction of steel mills instead. In order to survive in the competitive and unstable iron market previously described, the Anshan Works hoped to reduce production costs by exploiting the abundant low ferrous iron ore deposits around the works. Umene was appointed as a researcher for this special project. In addition, in 1921 the works invited six American scholars and engineers, led by Dr W. R. Appleby, the Head of the Department of Metallurgy at Minnesota University, to research the feasibility of such a project in Manchuria. The team concluded that exploitation of the low quality deposits would not be commercial. Umene, however, did not give up on the calcinated magnetising method, which could achieve reduction and magnetising at the same time. He started his own research, using a theoretical scientific method. According to the chemical reaction formula, it was known that a non-magnetic iron ore chemically reacts and becomes magnetic if hermetically sealed and heated to over 1300 °C. This amount of energy consumption was not feasible, but Umene found that by putting a reducing agent in the ore, he could get the same chemical result at temperatures under 500 to 700 °C. He had only to decide the temperature and the amount of the reducing agent. Through careful experiments, he finally perfected the calcinating magnetisation method, and in June 1922, he took out a patent on the process. Because of this innovation, 90 per cent of even non-magnetic iron ore could be separated. Even more important, this innovation caused Japanese blast furnace engineers to recognise the importance of the preparation of iron ore. Kawasaki Steel's Chiba Works, established in 1950 as the first large integrated greenfield works after the Second World War, and a model of efficient works, was the most important example. Asawa Saburo, who had been instructed by Umene at the Anshan Works, became Factory Manager of Kawasaki's Chiba Works and refined the preparatory techniques. About this technological continuity and development, he wrote:

We thoroughly developed the preparatory process of raw materials at the Chiba Works after the Second World War. In order to process the powder ore, we introduced the pelletizing method, which contributes to high performance ironmaking here. There can be no doubt that I owe the installment of this series of new equipment largely to Dr Umene .... Great technological achievement is never confined within itself, nor does it become just a thing of the past. I learned here that such great innovations (as Umene's) will be continuously succeeded by various applications.

— From The Japanese Iron and Steel Industry, 1850–1990.

Kuroda coke oven

This furnace recovered by-products through a regenerative burning apparatus, invented by Kuroda Taizo (黒田泰造 1883–1961) in 1918, engineer at the Yahata Works, it was a revolutionary energy-saving oven based on an energy-recycling system. The oven also improved by-product processing and increased coke processing yields. By 1933, the energy efficiency of the eighth coke oven at the Yahata Works was almost equal to that of the most advanced coke oven in Germany. The improvement in the quality of coke was directly reflected in the energy efficiency of iron and steelmaking. In addition, energy recycling techniques such as reuse of the gas generated in the coke oven and blast furnaces were exploited by the system. These efforts helped reduce the energy consumption of the works. The coal consumption per ton of steel production sharply dropped to 1.58 kg in 1933 from 3.7 kg in 1924. Eventually, Kuroda's idea of energy saving and recycling became fundamental for Japanese steel engineers. In 1962, this technological heritage would produce one of the most important innovations, the Basic Oxygen Furnace Waste Gas Cooling and Clearing System, invented at Yawata Steel (a successor of the Yahata Works).

=== Military ===
Aircraft Carrier

Hōshō was the world's first purpose-built aircraft carrier to be completed. She was commissioned in 1922 for the Imperial Japanese Navy (IJN). Hōshō and her aircraft group participated in the January 28 Incident in 1932 and in the opening stages of the Second Sino-Japanese War in late 1937.

Landing craft carrier

Shinshū Maru was the world's first landing craft carrier ship to be designed as such, to carry and launch landing craft making it a pioneer of modern-day amphibious assault ships. These concepts pioneered by Shinshū Maru persist to the current day, in the U.S. Navy's landing helicopter assault and landing helicopter dock amphibious assault ships.

Dock landing ship

The predecessor of all modern dock landing ships is Shinshū Maru of the Imperial Japanese Army, which could launch her infantry landing craft using an internal rail system and a stern ramp. She entered service in 1935 and saw combat in China and during the initial phase of Japanese offenses during 1942.

Diesel-powered tank

Japan was in the forefront of tank technology in the early 1930s when the land warfare found itself with state funding, introducing a number of innovations such as diesel tank engines. The world's first diesel-powered tank, this distinction goes to Japanese Type 89B I-Go Otsu, produced with a diesel engine from 1934 onwards.

Naval telegraphy

The Battle of Tsushima was the first naval battle in which wireless telegraphy (radio) played a critically important role. Wireless telegraphy played an important role from the start. At 04:55, Captain Narukawa of the Shinano Maru sent a message to Admiral Tōgō in Masampo that the "Enemy is in square 203". By 05:00, intercepted radio signals informed the Russians that they had been discovered and that Japanese scouting cruisers were shadowing them. Admiral Tōgō received his message at 05:05, and immediately began to prepare his battle fleet for a sortie.

Lieutenant Akiyama Saneyuki had been sent to the United States as a naval attaché in 1897. He witnessed firsthand the capabilities of radio telegraphy and sent a memo to the Navy Ministry urging that they push ahead as rapidly as possible to acquire the new technology. The ministry became heavily interested in the technology; however it found the cost of the Marconi wireless system, which was then operating with the Royal Navy, to be exceedingly expensive. The Japanese therefore decided to create their own radio sets by setting up a radio research committee under Professor Shunkichi Kimura, which eventually produced an acceptable system. In 1901, having attained radio transmissions of up to 70 miles (110 km), the navy formally adopted radio telegraphy. Two years later, a laboratory and factory were set up at Yokosuka to produce the Type 36 (1903) radios, and these were quickly installed on every major warship in the Combined Fleet by the time the war started.

Alexander Stepanovich Popov of the Naval Warfare Institute had built and demonstrated a wireless telegraphy set in 1900, and equipment from the firm Telefunken in Germany was adopted by the Imperial Russian Navy. Although both sides had early wireless telegraphy, the Russians were using German sets and had difficulties in their use and maintenance, while the Japanese had the advantage of using their own equipment.

Torpedo boat destroyer

Kotaka (Falcon), built in 1885. Designed to Japanese specifications and ordered from the Isle of Dogs, London Yarrow shipyard in 1885, she was transported in parts to Japan, where she was assembled and launched in 1887. The 165-foot (50 m) long vessel was armed with four 1-pounder (37 mm) quick-firing guns and six torpedo tubes, reached 19 knots (35 km/h), and at 203 tons, was the largest torpedo boat built to date. In her trials in 1889, Kotaka demonstrated that she could exceed the role of coastal defense, and was capable of accompanying larger warships on the high seas. The Yarrow shipyards, builder of the parts for Kotaka, "considered Japan to have effectively invented the destroyer".

Compressed oxygen torpedo

The Japanese began experimenting with oxygen-driven torpedoes about 1924, but gave up after numerous explosions and failures. Then, in 1927, an eight-man Japanese naval delegation went to the Whitehead Torpedo Works at Weymouth to study and buy a regular version of the Whitehead torpedo. While there, they believed that they had stumbled onto evidence that the Royal Navy was secretly experimenting with oxygen torpedoes. Although they were mistaken, the Japanese delegation was so impressed with the information they had gathered that they sent an extensive report back to Tokyo in 1928. By the end of that year, intensive research and experimentation had begun at the Kure Naval Arsenal on a workable oxygen torpedo. Starting in 1 932, this effort was led by Captain Kishimoto Kaneharu. Step by step, Captain Kishimoto and his colleagues began to attack the problems inherent in the design of such a weapon. Explosions were minimized by using natural air at the start of the engine's ignition, and oxygen was let in gradually to replace it. The men also took certain precautions to avoid contact between the oxygen and lubricants used in the torpedo's machinery. Particular care was given to the fuel lines. They were cleaned with a potassium compound to eliminate oil and grease and were redesigned to round out all sharp angles, and their linings were finely ground to eliminate all tiny pits where any residual oxygen, oil, or grease could accumulate. The first test firings of the system, incorporating an engine of standard Whitehead design but using oxygen in place of air, were successfully carried out in 1933. That year, the navy formally designated the weapon as the Type 93 torpedo, which has become known in the West as the "long-lance" torpedo, generally recognized as the best torpedo of World War II.

Ijuin fuse

This Japanese invention by Ijuin Gorō caused the shells to explode on impact rather than, like the Russian armour, simply penetrating the steel plating of enemy vessels and exploding below deck. It was not just the effect of the explosive charge that caused panic, When the shells hit they immediately threw out a wall of fire over everything in range. The Japanese shelling was terrifying and to the watching eyes of the Russians what was hurtling towards them seemed to be carton after carton of liquid fire.

Shimose powder

A picric acid explosive that the Japanese had developed a new type of shell for. The shell was thin-skinned, allowing more space for the Shimose powder explosive 10 percent of the total weight of the shell instead of the normal 2–3 percent. These shells bore the name of furoshiki. Shimose Powder, with its compound treated as top secret, was adopted by the Imperial Japanese Navy from 1893, not only for naval artillery but also for naval mines, depth charges and torpedo warheads. It played an important role in the Japanese victory in the Russo-Japanese War of 1904 to 1905.

Forerunner of the modern flamethrower

Richard Fiedler refined his flamethrower designs, aided by engineer and soldier Bernhard Reddemann. The Japanese are credited with the first use of compressed gas to project a flammable liquid. As early as the Russo-Japanese War, the Japanese army discovered that infantrymen were prone to suffer huge losses in front of well-guarded fortresses. They used animal organ oil and the kerosene was mixed and ignited, and the harmful gas produced was poured into the Russian defense building to force it to abandon the defense. Reddemann's interest in flame weapons had originally been sparked by reports from the battlefields of the 190450 Russo-Japanese War. During the siege of Port Arthur, Japanese combat engineers had used hand pumps to spray kerosene into Russian trenches. Once the Russians were covered with the flammable liquid, the Japanese would throw bundles of burning rags at them.

=== Textile ===
Automatic power loom with a non-stop shuttle-change motion

Sakichi Toyoda invented numerous weaving devices. His most famous invention was the automatic power loom in which he implemented the principle of Jidoka (autonomation or autonomous automation). It was the 1924 Toyoda Automatic Loom, Type G, a completely automatic high-speed loom featuring the ability to change shuttles without stopping and dozens of other innovations. At the time it was the world's most advanced loom, delivering a dramatic improvement in quality and a twenty-fold increase in productivity.This loom automatically stopped when it detected a problem such as thread breakage. This loom delivered the world's top performance in terms of productivity and textile quality. An engineer from Platt Brothers & Co., Ltd. of England, one of the world's leading manufacturers of textile machinery at the time, admiringly referred to this loom as "the magic loom".

Garabo spinning

Garabo (ガラ紡) indigenous technology as a transitional innovation between pre-modern cotton-spinning and industrial British-style spinning. The technical breakthrough for the design was attributed to the engineering genius of a single inventor and buddhist monk, Tokimune Gaun (臥雲辰致 1842–1900). The subsequent innovations of the Garabo were concentrated on the power supply system or the increase (and arrangement) of the spindles. Despite the latter increasing the complexity in frame structure, the core spinning mechanism was not altered. The Garabo technology was conceived as an affordable, accessible, and familiar technology to enhance productivity of peasant house-hold spinning, a common rural by-employment. Exhibited at the first National Industrial Exhibition (第1回内国勧業博覧会) in 1877, the machine was highly regarded by Gottfried Wagener (1831–1892) as the best invention displayed at the event. However, since the machine featured a simple mechanism, many imitations were manufactured. Despite its technically groundbreaking mechanism for resource and labour saving, in the absence of managerial transformation, it was unable to compete with the emergent British-style sector and its modern entrepreneurship.

Vinylon

The second man-made fiber to be invented, after nylon. It was first developed by Ichiro Sakurada, H. Kawakami, and Korean scientist Ri Sung-gi at the Takatsuki chemical research center in 1939 in Japan.

== Technology in postwar Japan (1945–present) ==
Since the mid-20th century, Japan has played an important role in diverse fields of research and development. In terms of the number of Triadic patents granted annually in the 21st century, Japan has the highest number in the world, ahead of the United States. Although several different patent families exist, the triadic patent family is widely recognized as the gold standard and highest quality level. Triadic patents are filed jointly in the largest global technology markets: the Japan Patent Office (JPO), the United States Patent and Trademark Office (USPTO), and the European Patent Office (EPO).

=== Audio ===
Digital audio

Commercial digital recording was pioneered by NHK and Nippon Columbia, also known as Denon, in the 1960s. The first commercial digital recordings were released in 1971.

In 1967, the first PCM (pulse-code modulation) recorder was developed by NHK's research facilities in Japan. In 1969, NHK expanded PCM's capabilities to 2-channel stereo and 32 kHz 13-bit resolution. In January 1971, using NHK'S PCM recording system, engineers at Denon recorded the first commercial digital recordings, including Uzu: The World of Stomu Yamash'ta 2 by Stomu Yamashta.

Compact Disc Digital Audio (CD-DA), also called Red Book, was an audio format developed by Sony and Philips in 1980, and commercially introduced with their compact disc (CD) format in 1982.

Speech synthesis

In 1968, the first text-to-speech synthesis system was developed by Noriko Umeda's team at Japan's Electrotechnical Laboratory.

Direct-drive turntables

The direct-drive turntable was invented by Shuichi Obata, an engineer at Matsushita (now Panasonic), based in Osaka, Japan. It eliminated the belts of older belt-drive turntables, and instead employed a motor to directly drive a platter on which a vinyl record rests. In 1969, Matsushita released it as the SP-10, the first direct-drive turntable on the market, and the first in their Technics series of turntables. This gave rise to turntablism, with the most influential turntable being the Technics SL-1200, released in 1972 and remaining the most widely used turntable in DJ culture for the next several decades.

DJ turntablism has origins in the invention of direct-drive turntables. Early belt-drive turntables were unsuitable for turntablism, since they had a slow start-up time, and they were prone to wear-and-tear and breakage, as the belt would break from backspinning or scratching. In 1972, Technics started making their SL-1200 turntable, which became the most popular turntable for DJs due to its high torque direct-drive design. Hip hop DJs began using the Technics SL-1200s as musical instruments to manipulate records with turntablism techniques such as scratching and beat juggling rather than merely mixing records. In 1975, hip-hop DJ Grand Wizard Theodore invented the scratching technique by accident. He developed the technique while experimenting with a Technics SL-1200 turntable, finding that its direct-drive motor would continue to spin at the correct RPM even if the DJ wiggled the record back and forth on the platter. Although Technics stopped producing the SL-1200 in 2010, they remain the most popular DJ turntable due to their high build quality and durability. The SL-1200 evolved into the SL-1200 MK2 in 1979—which, as of the early-2010s, remains an industry standard for DJing.

Walkman

The Walkman prototype was built in 1978 by audio-division engineer Nobutoshi Kihara for Sony co-founder Masaru Ibuka. Ibuka wanted to be able to listen to operas during his frequent trans-Pacific plane trips, and presented the idea to Kihara. The Walkman was commercially released in 1979.

=== Transportation ===
Bullet train

The world's first high volume capable (initially 12 car maximum) "high-speed train" was Japan's Tōkaidō Shinkansen, which officially opened in October 1964, with construction commencing in April 1959. The 0 Series Shinkansen, built by Kawasaki Heavy Industries, achieved maximum passenger service speeds of 210 km/h (130 mph) on the Tokyo–Nagoya–Kyoto–Osaka route, with earlier test runs hitting top speeds in 1963 at 256 km/h.

Kei car

Kei cars are a category of small automobiles invented in Japan, including passenger cars, vans, and pickup trucks. They are designed to exploit local tax and insurance relaxations, and in more rural areas are exempted from the requirement to certify that adequate parking is available for the vehicle.

=== Batteries ===
Lithium-ion battery

Akira Yoshino invented the modern lithium-ion battery in 1985. In 1991, Sony and Asahi Kasei released the first commercial lithium-ion battery using Yoshino's design.

=== Calculators ===
Electric calculators

The world's first all-electric compact calculator was the Casio Computer Company's Model 14-A, released in 1957. The first electronic desktop calculator with on-board memory was the Casio 001, released in 1965. In 1967, Casio released the AL-1000, the world's first programmable desktop calculator.

Large-scale integration (LSI)

The Sharp QT-8D, a desktop calculator released in 1969, was the first calculator to have its logic circuitry entirely implemented with LSI (large-scale integration) integrated circuits (ICs) based on MOS (metal-oxide-semiconductor) technology. Upon its introduction, it was one of the smallest electronic calculators ever produced commercially.

Portable calculators

The first portable calculators appeared in Japan in 1970, and were soon marketed around the world. These included the Sanyo ICC-0081 "Mini Calculator", the Canon Pocketronic, and the Sharp QT-8B "micro Compet". In January 1971, the Sharp EL-8 was close to being a pocket calculator, weighing about one pound, with a vacuum fluorescent display (VFD) and rechargeable NiCad batteries. The EL-8 was the first battery-powered handheld calculator.

The first truly pocket-sized electronic calculator was the Busicom LE-120A "HANDY", the first single-chip calculator to be built, released in February 1971. The Busicom 141-PF desktop calculator, released in March 1971, was the first computing machine to use a microprocessor, the 4-bit Intel 4004 (co-designed by Busicom's Masatoshi Shima).

LCD calculators

In 1971, Tadashi Sasaki began research on the use of LCD displays for calculators at Sharp Corporation. In 1973, Sharp commercially introduced the first LCD calculators.

=== Cameras ===
Analog cameras

The Asahiflex II, released by Asahi (Pentax) in 1954, was the world's first single-lens reflex camera (SLR camera) with an instant return mirror.

In 1967, Sony unveiled the Portapak, the first self-contained video tape analog recording system that was portable. On 25 August 1981, Sony unveiled a prototype of the first still video camera, the Sony Mavica. This camera was an analog electronic camera that featured interchangeable lenses and an SLR viewfinder.

Digital SLR (DSLR)

At Photokina in 1986, Nikon revealed a prototype digital still SLR camera, the Nikon SVC, the first digital SLR. The prototype body shared many features with the N8008. In 1988, Nikon released the first commercial DSLR camera, the QV-1000C.

The first full-frame DSLR cameras were developed in Japan from around 2000 to 2002: the MZ-D by Pentax, the N Digital by Contax's Japanese R6D team, and the EOS-1Ds by Canon.

Camcorders

In 1982, JVC and Sony announced the first camcorders, as CAMera/reCORDER combinations. That year, Sony released the first camcorder, the Betacam system, for professional use. In 1983, Sony released the first consumer camcorder, the Betamovie BMC-100P, and JVC released the first VHS-C camcorder.

Camera phone

In 2000, Sharp Corporation introduced the world's first camera phone, the J-SH04 J-Phone, in Japan.

=== Civil construction ===
Roller-compacted concrete dam

Japan is the country where the world's first roller-compacted concrete dam was constructed in 1980. Japanese engineers developed an approach defined as the "Roller-Compacted Dam method (RCD)" designed to achieve the same quality and appearance of conventional mass concrete, which resulted in the placement of RCC for the main body of Shimajigawa Dam in Japan, from 1978 to 1980. Since then, about 40 roller-compacted concrete dams have been constructed in Japan. Japanese roller-compacted concrete dams are called RCD dams and are distinguished from the other roller-compacted concrete dams (RCC) because there are some differences in their design and construction philosophies. The Japanese design is widely influential.

NSP kiln

The successful technological development of the new suspension preheater (NSP) kiln prompted Japanese cement companies to build up their technological development know-how. Companies successively began to develop new cement-manufacturing-related machinery. Japan came to lead the world in cement manufacturing technology. NSP technology has also been actively licensed overseas. The NSP kiln is a Japanese technology still used throughout the world today. It was developed by several Japanese cement companies, either independently or in collaboration with plant manufacturers. Several different successful systems were developed, but all of them included a separate furnace (calciner) with the preheater, thereby improving the decarbonization rate of the raw material and increasing the output of the rotary kiln.

=== Communications ===
Optical communication

While working at Tohoku University, Jun-ichi Nishizawa proposed fiber-optic communication, the use of optical fibers for optical communication, in 1963. Nishizawa invented other technologies that contributed to the development of optical fiber communications, such as the graded-index optical fiber as a channel for transmitting light from semiconductor lasers. He patented the graded-index optical fiber in 1964. The solid-state optical fiber was invented by Nishizawa in 1964.

Hardware elements providing the basis of internet technology, the three essential elements of optical communication, were invented by Jun-ichi Nishizawa: the semiconductor laser (1957) being the light source, the graded-index optical fiber (1964) as the transmission line, and the PIN photodiode (1950) as the optical receiver. Izuo Hayashi's invention of the continuous wave semiconductor laser in 1970 led directly to the light sources in fiber-optic communication, commercialized by Japanese entrepreneurs, and opened up the field of optical communication, playing an important role in the communication networks of the future. Their work laid the foundations for the Digital Revolution and the Information Age.

Mobile communication

The first emoji was created in 1998 or 1999 in Japan by Shigetaka Kurita.

=== Computing ===
Digital circuits

The parametron was a logic circuit element invented by Eiichi Goto in 1954. It was a digital computer element. Parametrons were used in Japanese computers from 1954 to the early 1960s, such as the University of Tokyo's PC-1 built in 1958, due to being reliable and inexpensive, but were ultimately surpassed by transistors due to differences in speed.

Digital computers

The ETL Mark I, Japan's first digital automatic computer, began development in 1951 and was completed in 1952. It was developed by the Electrotechnical Laboratory using relays, based on the switching circuit theory formulated by Akira Nakashima in the 1930s and advanced by Goto Mochinori in the 1940s.

Transistor computers

The ETL Mark III began development in 1954, and was completed in 1956, created by Japan's Electrotechnical Laboratory. It was the first stored-program transistor computer. It used ultrasonic delay-line memory.

The ETL Mark III's successor, the ETL Mark IV, began development in 1956 and was completed in 1957. It was a stored-program transistor computer with high-speed magnetic drum memory. A modified version of the ETL Mark IV, the ETL Mark IV A, was introduced in 1958, as a fully transistorised computer with magnetic-core memory and an index register.

The MARS-1 system was created by Mamoru Hosaka, Yutaka Ohno and others at the Railway Technical Research Institute in the 1950s, and was produced by Hitachi in 1958. It was the world's first computer reservation system for trains. The MARS-1 was capable of reserving seat positions, and was controlled by a transistor computer with a central processing unit consisting of a thousand transistors. It also had a 400,000-bit magnetic drum memory unit, and many registers, to indicate whether seats in a train were vacant or reserved, for communications with terminals, printing reservation notices, and CRT displays.

The use of microprogramming in electronic transistor computers dates back to 1961, with the KT-Pilot, an early microprogram-controlled electronic computer developed by Kyoto University and Toshiba in Japan.

Office computers

Compact office computers originated from Japan in the early 1960s. While American offices at the time ran large minicomputers loaded with business applications, Japanese manufacturers invented highly compact office computers, with hardware, operating systems, peripheral devices and application development languages specifically developed for business applications, playing a big role in Japan's booming economy. The first office computers released in 1961: Casio's TUC Compuwriter, NEC's NEAC-1201 parametron computer, and Unoke Denshi Kogyo's USAC-3010. In 1967, NEC introduced the NEAC-1240, the world's first small IC (integrated circuit) computer.

Computer music

In Japan, experiments in computer music date back to 1962, when Keio University professor Sekine and Toshiba engineer Hayashi experimented with the TOSBAC computer. This resulted in a piece entitled TOSBAC Suite. Later Japanese computer music compositions include a piece by Kenjiro Ezaki presented during Osaka Expo '70 and "Panoramic Sonore" (1974) by music critic Akimichi Takeda. Ezaki also published an article called "Contemporary Music and Computers" in 1970. Since then, Japanese research in computer music has largely been carried out for commercial purposes in popular music.

Computer graphics

Particularly well known iconic digital computer graphics images include Running Cola is Africa, by Masao Komura and Koji Fujino, created at the Computer Technique Group, Japan, in 1967.

4-bit microprocessors

The concept of a single-chip microprocessor CPU (central processing unit) was conceived in a 1968 meeting in Japan between Sharp engineer Tadashi Sasaki and an unnamed female software engineering researcher from Nara Women's College. He discussed the concept at a brainstorming meeting that was held in Japan. Sasaki attributes the basic invention to break the chipset of a calculator into four parts with ROM (4001), RAM (4002), shift registers (4003) and CPU (4004) to an unnamed woman, a software engineering researcher from Nara Women's College, who was present at the meeting. Sasaki then had his first meeting with Noyce in 1968. Sasaki discussed the microprocessor concept with Busicom and Intel in 1968, and presented the woman's four-division chipset concept to Intel and Busicom. This provided the basis for the single-chip microprocessor design of the Intel 4004. He was also involved in the development of the Busicom 141-PF desktop calculator which led to the 4004's creation. Sasaki thus played a key role in the creation of the first microprocessor.

The first commercial microprocessor, the 4-bit Intel 4004, began with the "Busicom Project" in 1968 as Masatoshi Shima's three-chip CPU design for the Busicom 141-PF calculator. In April 1968, Shima was tasked with designing a special-purpose LSI chipset, along with his supervisor Tadashi Tanba, for use in the Busicom 141-PF desktop calculator. This later became known as the "Busicom Project". His initial design consisted of seven LSI chips, including a three-chip CPU. His design included arithmetic units (adders), multiplier units, registers, read-only memory, and a macro-instruction set to control a decimal computer system. Busicom then wanted a general-purpose LSI chipset, for not only desktop calculators, but also other equipment such as a teller machine, cash register and billing machine. Shima thus began work on a general-purpose LSI chipset in late 1968.

In 1969, Busicom asked Intel, a company founded one year earlier in 1968 for the purpose of making solid state random-access memory (RAM), to finalize and manufacture their calculator engine. Intel, which was more of a memory company back then, had facilities to manufacture the high density silicon gate MOS chip Busicom required. Shima went to Intel in June 1969 to present his design proposal. Due to Intel lacking logic engineers to understand the logic schematics or circuit engineers to convert them, Intel asked Shima to simplify the logic. Intel wanted a single-chip CPU design, influenced by Sharp's Tadashi Sasaki who presented the concept to Busicom and Intel in 1968. The single-chip microprocessor design was then formulated by Intel's Marcian Hoff in 1969, simplifying Shima's initial design down to four chips, including a single-chip microprocessor CPU. Due to Hoff's formulation lacking key details, Shima came up with his own ideas to find solutions for its implementation. Shima was responsible for adding a 10-bit static shift register to make it useful as a printer's buffer and keyboard interface, many improvements in the instruction set, making the RAM organization suitable for a calculator, the memory address information transfer, the key program in an area of performance and program capacity, the functional specification, decimal computer idea, software, desktop calculator logic, real-time I/O control, and data exchange instruction between the accumulator and general purpose register. Hoff and Shima eventually realized the 4-bit microprocessor concept together, with the help of Intel's Stanley Mazor to interpret the ideas of Shima and Hoff. Busicom's management agreed to the new proposal. The architecture and specifications of the four chips were designed over a period of a few months in 1969, between an Intel team led by Hoff and a Busicom team led by Shima.

After Shima went back to Japan in late 1969 and then returned to Intel in early 1970, he found that no further work had been done on the 4004 since he left, and that Hoff was no longer working on the project. The project leader had become Federico Faggin, who had only joined Intel a week before Shima arrived. After explaining the project to Faggin, Shima worked with him to design the 4004 processor, with Shima responsible for the chip's logic. The chip's final design was completed in 1970 by Intel's Faggin and Busicom's Masatoshi Shima. The Intel 4004 was commercially released in 1971, first as part of the Busicom 141-PF calculator and then separately by Intel. The 4004 was also used in other Busicom machines, including an automated teller machine (ATM) and cash register. The microprocessor became the basis for microcomputers, which led to the microcomputer revolution.

NEC released the μPD707 and μPD708, a two-chip 4-bit microprocessor CPU, in 1971. They were followed by NEC's first single-chip microprocessor, the μPD700, in April 1972, a prototype for the μCOM-4 (μPD751), released in April 1973, combining the μPD707 and μPD708 into a single microprocessor. In 1973, Toshiba developed the TLCS-12, the world's first 12-bit microprocessor. The project began in 1971, when Toshiba began developing a microprocessor for Ford Motor Company's Electronic Engine Control (EEC) project, which went on to utilize Toshiba's 12-bit microprocessor.

8-bit to 32-bit microprocessors

Masatoshi Shima joined Intel in 1972. The Intel 8080, released in 1974, was the first general-purpose microprocessor. The 8-bit Intel 8080 was designed by Federico Faggin and Masatoshi Shima. Shima was employed to implement the transistor-level logic of the 8080. In 1975, Shima joined Zilog, where he designed the Zilog Z80 released in 1976 and the Zilog Z8000 released in 1979. After returning to Japan, Shima founded the Intel Japan Design Center in 1980 and VM Technology Corporation in 1986. At VM, he developed the 16-bit microprocessor VM860 and 32-bit microprocessor VM 8600 for the Japanese word processor market. He became a professor at the University of Aizu in 2000.

In 1975, Panafacom (a conglomeration of Fujitsu, Fuji Electric and Matsushita) developed the first commercial 16-bit single-chip microprocessor, the MN1610. According to Fujitsu, it was "the world's first 16-bit microcomputer on a single chip".

In the early 1990s, engineers at Hitachi found ways to compress RISC instruction sets so they fit in even smaller memory systems than CISC instruction sets. They developed a compressed instruction set for their SuperH series of microprocessors, introduced in 1992. The SuperH instruction set was later adapted for the ARM architecture's Thumb instruction set. Compressed instructions appeared in the ARM architecture, after ARM Holdings licensed SuperH patents as a basis for its Thumb instruction set.

Peripheral chips

While working for Intel in the 1970s, Masatoshi Shima designed a number of Intel peripheral chips. Some of his peripheral chips were used in the IBM PC, including the Intel 8259 interrupt controller, 8255 parallel port chip, 8253 timer chip, 8257 DMA chip, and 8251 serial communication USART chip.

Microcomputers

The first microcomputer was Sord Computer Corporation's SMP80/08. It was developed in 1972, using the 8-bit Intel 8008 microprocessor, which it was developed in tandem with.

The first personal computers based on the Intel 8080 were the Sord SMP80/x series, released in 1974. They were the first microcomputers with an operating system. The SMP80/x series marked a major leap toward the popularization of microcomputers. In 1977, Panafacom released an early 16-bit microcomputer, the Lkit-16, based on the 16-bit Panafacom MN1610 microprocessor they developed in 1975.

Home computers

Sord Computer Corporation's M200 Smart Home Computer, released in 1977, was one of the first home computers. It was an early desktop computer that combined a Zilog Z80 CPU, keyboard, CRT display, floppy disk drive and MF-DOS operating system into an integrated unit. The Sord M223 Mark VI, introduced in 1979, was an early personal computer to come standard with a built-in hard disk drive.

Yash Terakura's team at Commodore Japan was responsible for designing the color PET in 1979 and the VIC-20 (VIC-1001) in 1980. In 1981, the MAX Machine was developed by a team led by Yashi Terakura at Commodore Japan in 1981, and was a predecessor to the popular Commodore 64. Also in 1981, Terakura designed the Commodore 64, along with Shiraz Shivji. In 1982, NEC introduced the PC-9800 series, which went on to sell 18 million units.

3D computer graphics

An early example of 3D computer graphics software for personal computers is 3D Art Graphics, a set of 3D computer graphics effects, written by Kazumasa Mitazawa and released in June 1978 for the Apple II home computer.

The first implementation of Real-time 3D ray tracing was the LINKS-1 Computer Graphics System, built in 1982 at Osaka University's School of Engineering, by professors Ohmura Kouichi, Shirakawa Isao and Kawata Toru with 50 students. It was a massively parallel processing computer system with 514 microprocessors, used for rendering realistic 3D graphics with high-speed ray tracing. According to the Information Processing Society of Japan: "By developing a new software methodology specifically for high-speed image rendering, LINKS-1 was able to rapidly render highly realistic images." It was "used to create the world's first 3D planetarium-like video of the entire heavens that was made completely with computer graphics. The video was presented at the Fujitsu pavilion at the 1985 International Exposition in Tsukuba."

Music Macro Language (MML)

In 1978, Japanese personal computers such as the Sharp MZ and Hitachi Basic Master were capable of digital synthesis, which were sequenced using Music Macro Language (MML). This was used to produce chiptune video game music.

Graphics processing unit (GPU)

The NEC μPD7220, also known as the 7220, was the first true graphics processing unit (GPU), designed as a microprocessor, with VLSI, the first implementation of a graphics processor as a single Large Scale Integration (LSI) integrated circuit chip. This enabled the design of low-cost, high-performance video graphics cards, such as those from Number Nine Visual Technology, and was the basis for clones such as the Intel 82720. The 7220 project was started in 1979, and a paper was published in 1981. It debuted in Japan with NEC's PC-9800 series of personal computers in 1982, and then released independently. The 7220 had a fillrate of 1.25 megapixels per second and a rasterisation rate of 125 polygons (100-pixel by 100-pixel) per second, faster than central processing units (CPU) at the time. The 7220's high resolution color graphics led NEC to market it as a "resolution revolution". By 1983, it was used in NEC's APC computers, and other computers from Digital Equipment Corporation and Wang Laboratories.

The 7220 and its clones led the early GPU market for several years, and was still the best known GPU in 1986. It was eventually surpassed by the more powerful Hitachi HD63484 ACRTC, released in 1984.

Laptops

Yukio Yokozawa, an employee for Suwa Seikosha, a branch of Seiko (now Seiko Epson), invented the first notebook computer in July 1980, receiving a patent for the invention. Seiko's notebook computer, known as the HC-20 in Japan, was announced in 1981. In North America, Epson introduced it as the Epson HX-20 in 1981, at the COMDEX computer show in Las Vegas, where it drew significant attention for its portability. It had a mass-market release in July 1982, as the HC-20 in Japan and as the Epson HX-20 in North America. It was the first notebook-sized handheld computer (mobile device), the size of an A4 notebook and weighing 1.6 kg (3.5 lb). In 1983, the Sharp PC-5000 and Ampere WS-1 laptops from Japan featured a modern clamshell design.

FM synthesis and MIDI

The Yamaha GS-1, the first commercial FM digital synthesizer, released in 1980, was programmed using a proprietary Yamaha computer, which at the time was only available at Yamaha's headquarters in Japan (Hamamatsu) and the United States (Buena Park).

It was not until the advent of MIDI in 1983 that general-purpose computers started to play a key role in mainstream music production. In 1982, the NEC PC-88 and PC-98 computers introduced MIDI support.

MSX and Yamaha modules

In 1983, the Yamaha CX5 MSX computer and Yamaha MSX modules introduced FM synthesis and MIDI sequencing to the MSX personal computer, including MIDI software with capabilities such as synthesizing and sequencing sounds and rhythms. They provided synthesis, composition tools, and a 4-track MIDI sequencer, available on different cartridges.

The Yamaha CX5M is an MSX-based personal computer, specializing in music and sound production. It was originally released as the CX5 in 1983, before being upgraded to the CX5M in 1984. The CX5 was a YIS-303 MSX computer with a built-in SKW-01 sound module, while the CX5M was a YIS-503 Diabolik MSX computer with a built-in SFG-01 FM Sound Synthesizer Unit sound module. The CX5M was marketed as an electronic musical instrument, and was one of the most anticipated electronic music products of 1984.

It expands upon the normal features expected from these systems with a built-in eight-voice FM synthesizer module, manufactured by Yamaha Corporation, along with a MIDI interface. It came with graphical music software for digital synthesis and a sequencing, capable of synthesizing and sequencing sounds and rhythms, with its internal FM synthesizer or external MIDI devices. It provided synthesis, composition tools, and a four-track MIDI sequencer, available on different cartridges.

The SFG-01 FM Sound Synthesizer Unit, released in 1983, uses several chips, including a Yamaha YM2151 FM sound chip, YM3012 stereo DAC, YM2210 MIDI communications chip, YM2148 keyboard scanning chip, and YM2148 MIDI UART. It also has stereo audio outputs, an input for a purpose-built four-octave keyboard, and a pair of MIDI Input/Output ports. It had limited MIDI support on the original CX5M model, with only management of data from a Yamaha DX7 digital synthesizer. The YIS-303, CX5, YIS-503 and CX5M computers could be upgraded with the SFG-01 FM Sound Synthesizer Unit II sound module, released in 1984, featuring an upgraded Yamaha YM2164 sound chip and full MIDI support, which could be used for normal MIDI. The SFG-05 module came integrated with the second CX5M revision, the CX5M II.

Music software were released on MSX cartridges, including YRM-101/YRM11 FM Music Composer, YRM-102/YRM12 FM Voicing Program, YRM-103/YRM13 DX-7 Voicing Program, YRM-104/YRM15 Yamaha FM Music Macro, YRM-105 DX-9 Voicing Program, YRM-301 MIDI Recorder YRM-301, YRM-302 RX Editor, YRM-303 MIDI Macro & Monitor, YRM-304 TX-7 Voicing Program, YRM-305 DX-21 Voicing Program, YRM-501 FM Music Composer II, YRM-502 FM Voicing program, YRM-504 Yamaha FM Music Macro II, and YRM-506 FB-01 Voicing Program.

Later, Yamaha released the Yamaha FB-01 MIDI module, which was effectively an SFG-05 in a standalone, portable case. FB-01 is an independent Z80 microprocessor system that sends and receives data from YM2164. The FB-01 was released in 1986.

Sound cards and sound modules

In 1983, Roland Corporation's CMU-800 sound module introduced music synthesis and sequencing to the PC, Apple II, and Commodore 64.

The spread of MIDI on computers was facilitated by Roland Corporation's MPU-401, released in 1984. It was the first MIDI-equipped PC sound card, capable of MIDI sound processing and sequencing. After Roland sold MPU sound chips to other sound card manufacturers, it established a universal standard MIDI-to-PC interface. The widespread adoption of MIDI led to computer-based MIDI software being developed. In 1987, Roland introduced LA synthesis to the computer music market, with the Roland D-50 MIDI synthesizer.

USB

A group of several companies began the development of USB in 1994, including Japanese company NEC.

=== Displays ===
Aperture grille

Aperture grille is one of the two major CRT display technologies. Aperture grille was introduced by Sony with their Trinitron television in 1968. The Trinitron television was invented by Sony's Susumu Yoshida in 1968.

Shadow mask

The other major CRT display technology.

Handheld television

In 1970, Panasonic released the first handheld television, small enough to fit in a large pocket, the Panasonic IC TV Model TR-001. It featured a 1.5-inch display, along with a 1.5-inch speaker.

Liquid crystal display (LCD)

LCD displays incorporating thin film and transistors were demonstrated in 1970 by J. Kishimoto from Canon and Katsumi Yamamura from Suwa Seikosha (Seiko), and further developed by Sharp Corporation in 1976. In 1977, a TFT LCD (thin-film transistor LCD) display was demonstrated by a Sharp team consisting of Kohei Kishi, Hirosaku Nonomura, Keiichiro Shimizu and Tomio Wada. The LCD color display was invented by Sharp's Shinji Kato and Takaaki Miyazaki in May 1975, and then improved by Fumiaki Funada and Masataka Matsuura in December 1975.

The first LCD televisions were invented as color handheld televisions in Japan. In 1980, Hattori Seiko's R&D group began development on pocket LCD color televisions, which led to the release of the first commercial TFT LCD displays by three of its subsidiaries. In 1982, Seiko Epson released the first LCD television, the Epson TV Watch, a wristwatch equipped with an active-matrix LCD television. In 1983, Casio released a handheld LCD television, the Casio TV-10. In 1984, Epson released the ET-10, the first full-color, pocket LCD television. Seiko Hattori subsidiary Citizen Watch introduced the Citizen Pocket TV, a color TFT LCD handheld television, with a 2.7-inch display, in 1984. By 1985, two other Seiko Hattori subsidiaries had also introduced TFT LCD handheld televisions, with Seiko's color micro-TV and the Epson ELF.

High definition television (HDTV)

As Japanese consumer electronics firms forged ahead with the development of HDTV technology, and as the MUSE format proposed by NHK, a Japanese company, was seen as a pacesetter that threatened to eclipse US electronics companies. MUSE, the development of which began in the 1970s, was a hybrid system with analog and digital features. Until 1990, the Japanese MUSE standard was the front-runner among the more than 23 different technical concepts under consideration.

Widescreen

Widescreen televisions date back to the 1970s, when Japan's NHK introduced the MUSE high-definition television system, which was soon backed by Sony and other Japanese television manufacturers.

LCD watches

Tetsuro Hama and Izuhiko Nishimura of Seiko received a US patent dated February 1971 for an electronic wristwatch incorporating a TN LCD. Sharp Corporation mass-produced TN LCDs for watches in 1975.

Large LCD displays

Sharp Corporation developed the first large LCD in 1986, based on color TFT LCD technology. In 1988, Sharp introduced the first commercial large LCD television, a 14" TFT LCD model with active matrix addressing. The release of Sharp's large LCD TV in 1988 led to Japan launching an LCD industry, which developed large-size LCDs, including TFT computer monitors and LCD televisions.

Plasma

The world's first color plasma display was produced by Fujitsu and released in 1989.

LCD projectors

Epson developed the 3LCD color projection technology in the 1980s, and licensed it for use in LCD projectors in 1988. The first color LCD video projectors were Epson's compact 3LCD-based VPJ-700, released in January 1989, and an LCD color video projector released by Sharp Corporation in 1989. Epson's 3LCD technology went on to be adopted by about 40 different projector brands worldwide.

LED-backlit LCD

The world's first LED-backlit LCD television was Sony's Qualia 005, released in 2004.

=== Electronics ===
Jun-ichi Nishizawa invented ion implantation in 1950.

Neodymium magnets were invented independently in 1982 by General Motors (GM) and Sumitomo Special Metals. It is the most widely used type of rare-earth magnet.

Transistors and thyristors

In 1950, the static induction transistor was invented by Jun-ichi Nishizawa and Y. Watanabe. It was the first type of JFET (junction gate field-effect transistor), with a short channel length. In 1971, Jun-ichi Nishizawa invented the static induction thyristor.

Diodes

The PIN diode/photodiode was invented by Jun-ichi Nishizawa and his colleagues in 1950. This was the basis for the laser diode. In 1952, Nishizawa invented the avalanche photodiode. Nishizawa also introduced tunnel injection in 1958, and invented the varicap (variable capacitance diode) in 1959.

Lasers

In 1955, Jun-ichi Nishizawa invented the first solid-state maser. In 1957, Nishizawa filed a patent for the first semiconductor laser, and discovered semiconductor inductance.

The continuous wave semiconductor laser was invented by Izuo Hayashi and Morton B. Panish in 1970. This led directly to the light sources in fiber-optic communication, laser printers, barcode readers, and optical disc drives, technologies that were commercialized by Japanese entrepreneurs.

In 1992, Japanese inventor Shuji Nakamura invented the first efficient blue laser (blue LED). Nakamura invented it with Isamu Akasaki and Hiroshi Amano, for which the three of them were awarded the 2014 Nobel Prize in Physics, stating that it "enabled bright and energy-saving white light sources", for applications such as LED lamps.

Digital fax

The first digital fax machine was the Dacom Rapidfax, first sold in the late 1960s.

Automated teller machine (ATM)

The idea of an automated teller machine (ATM), for out-of-hours cash distribution, developed from bankers' needs in Japan. The Japanese device was called "Computer Loan Machine" and supplied cash as a three-month loan at 5% p.a. after inserting a credit card. The device was operational in 1966. The first microprocessor-based ATM machines were released by Busicom in the early 1970s, using the Intel 4004 (co-designed by Busicom's Masatoshi Shima).

=== Games ===
The first handheld electronic game was Electro Tic-Tac-Toe, released by Japanese manufacturer Waco in 1972.

The first color video game was the 1973 arcade game Playtron, developed by Japanese company Kasco (Kansei Seiki Seisakusho Co.), which only manufactured two cabinets of the game. The first video game to represent player characters as human sprite images was Taito's Basketball, which was licensed in February 1974 to Midway, releasing it as TV Basketball in North America. Tomohiro Nishikado's arcade racing video game Speed Race, released by Taito in 1974, introduced scrolling graphics, where the sprites move along a vertical scrolling overhead track.

The first tile-based video game was Namco's arcade game Galaxian (1979). It debuted the Namco Galaxian arcade system board, which used specialized graphics hardware, supporting RGB color and introducing multi-colored sprites, tilemap backgrounds, a sprite line buffer system, and scrolling graphics. The Namco Galaxian hardware was widely adopted by other arcade game manufacturers during the golden age of arcade video games, including Centuri, Gremlin, Irem, Konami, Midway, Nichibutsu, Sega and Taito. It also inspired Nintendo's hardware for Radar Scope and Donkey Kong as well as the Nintendo Entertainment System home console.

Hardware sprite graphics was introduced by Namco's Pac-Man (1980), with the Namco Pac-Man hardware.

=== Instruments ===
Japanese electronic musical instruments were important to the development of electronic music and electronic dance music, such as the Roland TR-808 and TR-909 drum machines, the Roland TB-303 bass synth, and the Technics SL-1200 direct-drive turntable.

Electronic organ

Yamaha engineer Mr. Yamashita invented the Yamaha Magna Organ in 1935. It was an electrostatic reed organ, a multi-timbral keyboard instrument based on electrically blown free reeds with pickups.

Electronic drum

At the 1964 NAMM Convention, Japanese company Ace Tone revealed the R-1 Rhythm Ace, the first fully transistorized electronic drum instrument. Created by Ikutaro Kakehashi, who later founded Roland Corporation, the R-1 was a hand-operated percussion device that played electronic drum sounds manually as the user pushed buttons, in a similar fashion to modern electronic drum pads.

Since the 1970s, a number of Japanese companies began selling popular electronic drum kits, notably Roland's Octapad and V-Drums, and Yamaha's electronic Yamaha Drums and Yamaha DTX series. In 1997, Roland introduced its TD-10 model, a sound module for its V-Drums.

Rhythm machines (drum machines)

In 1963, Keio-Giken (Korg) released their first rhythm machine, Donca-Matic DA-20, using vacuum tube circuits for sounds and mechanical-wheel for rhythm patterns. It was a floor-type machine with built-in speaker, and featuring a keyboard for the manual play, in addition to the multiple automatic rhythm patterns. Its price was comparable with the average annual income of Japanese at that time. Their efforts were then focused on the improvement of reliability and performance, along with the size reduction and the cost down. Unstable vacuum tube circuit was replaced with reliable transistor circuitry on Donca-Matic DC-11 in the mid-1960s, and in 1966, bulky mechanical-wheels were also replaced with compact transistor circuitry on Donca-Matic DE-20 and DE-11. In 1967, Korg Mini Pops MP-2 was developed as an option of the Yamaha Electone (electronic organ), and Mini Pops was established as a series of compact desktop rhythm machines.

Nippon Columbia received a 1965 patent for an electronic automatic rhythm machine instrument. It described it as an "automatic rhythm player which is simple but capable of electronically producing various rhythms in the characteristic tones of a drum, a piccolo and so on."

At around the same time, Korg also introduced transistor circuitry for their Donca-Matic DC-11 electronic drum machine, some time between 1963 and 1966. The Korg Mini Pops MP-2, MP-5 and MP-7 were released in 1967. Korg's Stageman and Mini Pops series of drum machines, introduced in 1967, were notable for "natural metallic percussion" sounds and incorporating controls for drum "breaks and fill-ins." The smaller MP-5 had 10 preset rhythms, while the larger MP-7 had 20 preset rhythms. Both had controls for tone, tempo, and volume, while the MP-7 also had dedicated faders for adding ouijada, guiro and tambourine. The controls allowed the user to press more than one preset to combine rhythms. One notable use of a Mini Pops drum machine was by French musician Jean-Michel Jarre, in the final part of his breakthrough album, Oxygene (1976). This rhythm was achieved by overlaying two of the presets. He also used it for his 1978 album Equinoxe. The Donca-Matic is also referenced in Gorillaz' "Doncamatic" (2010).

As the result of their robustness and compact size, rhythm machines were gradually installed on electronic organs as accompaniment of organists, and finally spread widely. Ace Tone drum machines found their way into popular music starting in the late 1960s, followed by Korg and Roland drum machines in the early 1970s. The first major pop song to use a drum machine was "Saved by the Bell" by Robin Gibb, which reached No. 2 in Britain in 1969. It used a "slow rock" rhythm preset on Ace Tone's FR-1 Rhythm Ace. The German krautrock band Can also used a drum machine on their song "Peking O" (1971), which combined acoustic drumming with Ace Tone's Rhythm Ace drum machine. The first album on which a drum machine produced all the percussion was Kingdom Come's Journey, recorded in November 1972 using Ace Tone's Bentley Rhythm Ace. Timmy Thomas' 1972 R&B single "Why Can't We Live Together"/"Funky Me" featured a distinctive use of a Roland drum machine and keyboard arrangement on both tracks. George McCrae's 1974 disco hit "Rock Your Baby" used a drum machine, an early Roland rhythm machine.

Effects pedals

The Uni-Vibe, also known as Jax Vibra-Chorus, is a footpedal-operated phaser or phase shifter for creating chorus and vibrato simulations for electric organ or guitar. Designed by audio engineer Fumio Mieda, it was introduced in the 1960s by Japanese company Shin-ei, and then released in North America by Univox in 1968. The pedals soon became favorite effects pedals of rock guitarists Jimi Hendrix and Robin Trower.

In 1976, Roland subsidiary Boss Corporation released the CE-1 Chorus Ensemble, which was a stand-alone unit of the chorus/vibrato circuit found in the Roland JC-120 amplifier. The chorus circuit from the amp was put it into a stomp box, making the CE-1 the first chorus pedal. The chorus pedal went on to become a standard effects unit among guitarists. Boss effects units subsequently became the de facto standard of guitar effects for decades, with many guitarists relying on them for sonic experimentation.

Boss Corporation's DD-2 Digital Delay, released in 1983, was the world's first digital delay effects unit in stomp box form. It uses a custom integrated circuit (IC) chip that was originally developed for Roland Corporation's SDE-3000 rack delay unit. It was succeeded by the DD-3 Digital Delay in 1986. Boss Corporation's RV-2 Digital Reverb, released in 1987, was the world's first digital reverb pedal. It used a new custom DSP processor developed by Boss, originally for the RRV-10 Digital Reverb in the Micro Rack series.

Analog synthesizers

Yamaha developed an early multi-voice polyphonic synthesizer, the Yamaha GX-1, in 1973. In 1974, Roland Corporation released the EP-30, the first touch-sensitive electronic keyboard. Roland released an early polyphonic string synthesizer, the Roland RS-202, in 1975, followed by the Roland RS-202 in 1976.

Digital synthesizers

In 1973, Yamaha licensed the algorithms for frequency modulation synthesis (FM synthesis) from John Chowning, who had experimented with it at Stanford University since 1971. Yamaha's engineers began adapting Chowning's algorithm for use in a commercial digital synthesizer, adding improvements such as the "key scaling" method to avoid the introduction of distortion that normally occurred in analog systems during frequency modulation. In the 1970s, Yamaha were granted a number of patents, under the company's former name "Nippon Gakki Seizo Kabushiki Kaisha", evolving Chowning's early work on FM synthesis technology. Yamaha built the first prototype digital synthesizer in 1974.

Released in 1979, the Casio VL-1 was the first commercial digital synthesizer. selling for $69.95. The first commercial FM digital synthesizer was the Yamaha GS-1 in 1980.

The mainstream breakthrough for digital synthesis came with the 1983 release of the FM-based Yamaha DX7, one of the best-selling synthesizers of all time.

Vowel–consonant synthesis is a type of hybrid digital-analog synthesis developed by Casio and first employed by the early Casiotone keyboards in the early 1980s.

Sequencer

In the early 1970s, Ralph Dyck, a Canadian composer and technologist, developed a prototype digital music sequencer, based on TTL digital circuitry, shift-register memory, and single-channel audio. There were no North American companies interested in his prototype, until Japanese company Roland Corporation took an interest in it. Roland founder Ikutaro Kakehashi saw the prototype, and decided to build a digital sequencer based on his prototype, making a number of major changes. Kakehashi decided to replace the TTL circuitry with a microprocessor, replace the small shift-register memory with larger RAM memory, and increase the audio channels from a single channel to eight channels. As Dyck was generally unfamiliar with how to use a microprocessor for a sequencer, Kakehashi hired Yukio Tamada to design and build a microprocessor-based sequencer. Roland switched from discrete circuitry to the then brand new Intel 8080A 8-bit microprocessor and increased the memory from 512 bytes shift-register memory to 16 KB RAM memory, allowing storage of over 5,300 notes, which could be entered via the calculator keyboard (the preferred method) or recorded in real-time (not so easy).

In 1977, Roland Corporation released the MC-8 Microcomposer, also called a computer music composer by Roland. It was the first standalone, microprocessor-based, digital CV/Gate music sequencer, and an early polyphonic sequencer. It introduced new features, such as a keypad to enter note information; 16 kilobytes of random access memory which allowed a maximum sequence length of 5,200 notes, a huge step forward from the 8–16 step sequencers at the time; the allocation of multiple pitch CVs to a single Gate channel, creating polyphonic parts within the overall sequence; and eight-channel polyphony, allowing the creation of polyrhythmic sequences.

The swingy funk element present throughout the Japanese synthpop album Yellow Magic Orchestra (1978) was expressed by Hideki Matsutake programming through subtle variations of the MC-8's input. Giorgio Moroder was another early commercial user of the MC-8, having used it from the late 1970s to the 1980s. Other notable users include Ryuichi Sakamoto,Altered Images, Chris Carter, Suzanne Ciani, Chris & Cosey, Kraftwerk, Landscape, The Human League, Martin Rushent, Pete Shelley, Tangerine Dream, Richard James Burgess, Vince Clarke, Throbbing Gristle, Isao Tomita, Toto, Yellow Magic Orchestra, and Hans Zimmer.

The MC-8 was the first in the Microcomposer family of sequencers, including the Roland MC-4 Microcomposer and Roland MC-202. The Roland MC-8 had a significant impact on electronic music, with the MC-8 and its descendants having more of an impact on electronic music production in the 1970s and 1980s than any other family of sequencers. CV/Gate sequencers such as the MC-8 and MC-4 were eventually succeeded by MIDI sequencers in the 1980s. The Microcomposer series continued with grooveboxes, including the Roland MC-202 (1983), MC-303 (1996), MC-505 (1998), MC-09 (1999), MC-307 (1999), MC-909 (2002) and MC-808 (2006).

Programmable drum machines (step sequencers)

Prior to Ikutaro Kakehashi's founding of Roland Corporation in 1972, Kakehashi had discussed the idea of a programmable drum machine while at Ace Tone, some time between 1967 and 1972. In 1975, Ace Tone released the Rhythm Producer FR-15 that enables the modification of the pre-programmed rhythm patterns.

1978 saw the release of the Roland CR-78, the first microprocessor programmable rhythm machine, with four memory banks to store user patterns, and controls for accents and muting. Its combination of programmability and familiar preset rhythms made it popular from the late 1970s to the early 1980s, widely adopted by artists such as Blondie, Phil Collins, Ultravox, Underworld, Fatboy Slim, BT, Gary Numan, 808 State, Peter Gabriel, Hall & Oates, Jimmy Edgar, Genesis, Überzone, Bryan Ferry, Men Without Hats, John Foxx and OMD.

The Roland TR-808, released in 1980, was the first drum machine with the ability to program an entire percussion track of a song from beginning to end, complete with breaks and rolls. It also includes volume knobs for each voice, and has bass drum decay controls that could lengthen the sound to create uniquely low frequencies which flatten over long periods, which can be used to create basslines or bass drops. The TR-808 became one of the most influential inventions in popular music, used on more hit records than any other drum machine, and shaping genres such as dance, electronic, hip hop and pop music.

Bass synthesizer-sequencers

The first bass synthesizer with a music sequencer was the Firstman SQ-01. It was originally released in 1980 by Hillwood/Firstman, a Japanese synthesizer company founded in 1972 by Kazuo Morioka (who later worked for Akai in the early 1980s), and was then released by Multivox for North America in 1981. The most influential bass synthesizer-sequencer was the Roland TB-303, released in 1981, later becoming the basis of acid house music.

Digital Control Bus (DCB) and DIN sync

In 1980, Roland Corporation introduced the Digital Control Bus (DCB) communications protocol, using the DIN sync interface to synchronize different electronic musical instruments. It was introduced with the Roland TR-808 in 1980, considered groundbreaking at the time, followed by other Roland equipment in 1981. It was the precursor to MIDI, which adopted most of its features from the DCB protocol, including the same type of connectors as the DIN sync interface.

DCB was introduced in 1980 with the Roland TR-808, followed by other Roland equipment, including the CR-8000, TR-606, TB-303, EP-6060, Jupiter-8, and Juno-60. It uses DIN sync connectors, and DCB functions were basically the same as MIDI, which it was the basis for.

DIN sync was introduced by Roland Corporation for the synchronization of music sequencers, drum machines, arpeggiators and similar devices, as part of the Digital Control Bus protocol. It was introduced in 1980 with the Roland TR-808, followed by other Roland equipment in 1981, including the CR-8000, TR-606, TB-303 and EP-6060. It was the basis for the MIDI interface, released in 1983, which eventually superseded it. DIN sync was also adopted by non-Roland instruments, such as Linn Electronics' LinnDrum.

MIDI (Musical Instrument Digital Interface)

In 1981, Roland founder Ikutaro Kakehashi proposed the concept of standardization to Oberheim Electronics, Sequential Circuits, Yamaha, Korg and Kawai. A common MIDI standard was developed, working with Roland's pre-existing DCB as a basis, by Roland, Yamaha, Korg, Kawai, and Sequential Circuits. MIDI was publicly announced in 1982. MIDI allowed communication between different instruments and general-purpose computers to play a role in music production. Since its introduction, MIDI has remained the musical instrument industry standard interface through to the present day. Kakehashi received the 2013 Technical Grammy Award for the invention of MIDI.

PCM sampler

The first PCM digital sampler was Toshiba's LMD-649, created in 1981 by engineer Kenji Murata for Japanese electronic music band Yellow Magic Orchestra, who used it for extensive sampling and looping in their 1981 album Technodelic.

MIDI instruments

The first MIDI synthesizers were the Roland Jupiter-6 and the Prophet 600, both released in 1982. The first MIDI sequencer was Roland Corporation's MSQ-700, released in 1983. Sequential Circuits CEO Dave Smith demonstrated MIDI by connecting the Prophet 600 to a Jupiter-6 during the January 1983 Winter NAMM Show.

While the Roland TR-808 was fully based on analog synthesis, the Roland TR-909, released in 1983, combined analogue synthesis with digital sampling. It was also the first MIDI drum machine. Much like the TR-808's importance to hip hop, the TR-909 holds a similar important for electronic dance music, such as techno and house music. For example, the seminal deep house track "Can You Feel It" (1986) was produced using the Roland Juno-60 polyphonic synthesizer for the bassline and the TR-909 rhythm machine for the drumline.

USB drum MIDI controllers are often designed to resemble popular classic drum machines such as the Roland TR-808 and Akai MPC.

Groovebox

The Roland MC-202, released in 1983, was the first groovebox. The term "groovebox" was later coined by Roland Corporation in reference to its successor, the Roland MC-303, released in 1996.

Wind synths

From the mid-1980s, Akai developed a range of wind synths. Their EWI-1000 wind controller and EVI-1000 valve controller, like the Lyricon, were paired with a dedicated analog, voltage-controlled voice module, the EWV-2000. The EWV-2000 had no MIDI IN, though it did have MIDI OUT. The EWI-1000/EWV-2000 pair were actually a hybrid digital/analog system. Analog signals were derived from the various sensors (e.g., key, bite, bend, etc.) on the EWI-1000 controller unit, then converted to digital signals by a front-end microprocessor in the EWV-2000. These digital signals were then altered by the microprocessor and D/A converted to internal analog control voltages appropriate for the analog synthesizer IC's within the EWV-2000. The D/A used within the EWV-2000 used a very high resolution and conversion rate, such that the responsiveness to the player felt immediate, i.e. "analog." The subsequent EWI-3000 and EWI-3020 systems also used this A/D/A scheme within their dedicated tone modules, though these later models of the EWI would support MIDI IN and OUT.

Linear arithmetic synthesis

Linear arithmetic synthesis (LA synthesis) is a type of sound synthesis invented by Roland Corporation, introduced with the Roland D-50 synthesizer in 1987. LA synthesis was since used by a number of other Roland equipment, such as the MT-32 sound module in 1987 and the E-20 synthesizer in 1988.

The Roland D-50 is a polyphonic 61-key digital synthesizer, produced by Roland and released in 1987. Its features include LA synthesis, on-board effects, a joystick for data manipulation, and an analogue synthesis-styled layout design. It was also produced in a rack-mount variant design, the D-550 (1987–1990), with almost 450 user-adjustable parameters. The D-50 saw widespread use in popular music, with a distinctive sound that largely defined popular late 1980s music. Today, the D-50 is still highly popular as affordable vintage synth. It has the highest score by users of all synths at VintageSynth. The D-50 was the first affordable synthesizer to combine sample playback with digital synthesis, a process that Roland called LA synthesis.

=== Memory ===
Magnetic disks

What may have been the idea of the first floppy disk, or magnetic disk sheet, was invented by Yoshiro Nakamatsu at the Tokyo Imperial University in 1950. He received a Japanese patent in 1952, and a 1958 American patent, for a magnetic disk record sheet. Nippon Columbia planned to commercialized his magnetic disc sheet recorder in 1960. He licensed a number of patents to IBM, reaching licensing agreements with them in the 1970s.

Sony introduced the 3½-inch floppy disk format, called the micro floppy disk. The first commercial micro floppy disk drive was the Sony OA-D30V, released in 1981. Sony's initial 3½-inch floppy disk format was dual-sided and held 875 KB of data storage.

Random-access memory (RAM)

The Toshiba Toscal BC-1411 electronic calculator, which debuted in 1965, introduced an early form of dynamic random-access memory (DRAM) built from discrete components.

By 1986, NEC and AMD were manufacturing 32 KB VRAM (Video RAM) chips, compared to Texas Instruments which were manufacturing 8 KB VRAM chips at the time.

Optical discs

The compact disc (CD) format was developed by Sony and Philips in 1979, and commercially released in 1982. The CD-ROM format was developed by Japanese company Denon in 1982. It was an extension of Compact Disc Digital Audio, and adapted the format to hold any form of digital data, with a storage capacity of 553 MiB. CD-ROM was then introduced by Denon and Sony at a Japanese computer show in 1984.

In 1984, Sony introduced a LaserDisc format that could store any form of digital data, as a data storage device similar to CD-ROM, with a larger capacity of 3.28 GiB. The DVD format was developed by Sony, Panasonic and Toshiba in 1994. The same year, Sony and Tatung Company released the first DVD player.

Flash memory

Flash memory (both NOR and NAND types) was invented by Dr. Fujio Masuoka while working for Toshiba around 1980.

=== Metallurgy ===
Mitsubishi process

Developed by the Mitsubishi Heavy Industries and superior to the conventional process, it is a continuous copper smelting and converting process comprising three steps—smelting of raw materials by injection, separation of slag and matte, and direct converting of high-grade matte. Since commercial operation began in 1974, the hearth productivity has been doubled, and several other improvements have been made, including higher-grade matte smelting and the treatment of various secondary materials.

=== Printing ===
Electronic printer

The first electronic printer was the EP-101, invented by Japanese company Epson and released in 1968.

Inkjet printer

The world's first inkjet printer was Casio's Typuter, released in 1971.

Thermal transfer printing

Invented by SATO corporation, a Japanese company. They produced the world's first thermal transfer label printer, SATO M-2311, in 1981.

3D printing

In 1981, Hideo Kodama of Nagoya Municipal Industrial Research Institute invented two additive methods for fabricating three-dimensional plastic models with photo-hardening thermoset polymer, where the UV exposure area is controlled by a mask pattern or a scanning fiber transmitter.

Hydrographics

Hydrographics, also known variously as immersion printing, water transfer printing, water transfer imaging, hydro dipping, or cubic printing has an somewhat fuzzy history. Three different Japanese companies are given credit for its invention. Taica Corporation claims to have invented cubic printing in 1974. However, the earliest hydrographic patent was filed by Motoyasu Nakanishi of Kabushiki Kaisha Cubic Engineering in 1982.

=== Timekeeping ===
Automatic quartz

The first watch to combine self-winding with a crystal oscillator for timekeeping was unveiled by Seiko in 1986.

Quartz wristmatch

The world's first quartz wristwatch was revealed in 1967: the prototype of the Astron revealed by Seiko in Japan, where it was in development since 1958. It was eventually released to the public in 1969.

Spring Drive

A watch movement which was first conceived by Yoshikazu Akahane working for Seiko in 1977 and was patented in 1982. It features a true continuously sweeping second hand, rather than the traditional beats per time unit, as seen with traditional mechanical and most quartz watches.

=== Video ===
Video tape

Dr. Norikazu Sawazaki invented a prototype video tape recorder in 1953, based on helical scan technology.

Video disc

In Japan, the TOSBAC computer was using digital video disks to display color pictures at 256x256 image resolution in 1972.

In 1975, Hitachi introduced a video disc system in which chrominance, luminance and sound information were encoded holographically. Each frame was recorded as a 1mm diameter hologram on a 305mm disc, while a laser beam read out the hologram from three angles. In 1978, Hitachi invented a digital video storage system, which they received a patent for.

In the late 1970s to the early 1980s, several types of video production equipment that were digital in their internal workings were introduced, including digital video effects (DVE) units such as the NEC DVE.

=== Other ===
Artificial snowflake

The first artificial snowflake was created by Japanese physicist Ukichiro Nakaya in 1936, three years after his first attempt.

Rollerball pen

The first rollerball pen was invented in 1963 by the Japanese company Ohto.
