= Science and technology in Japan =

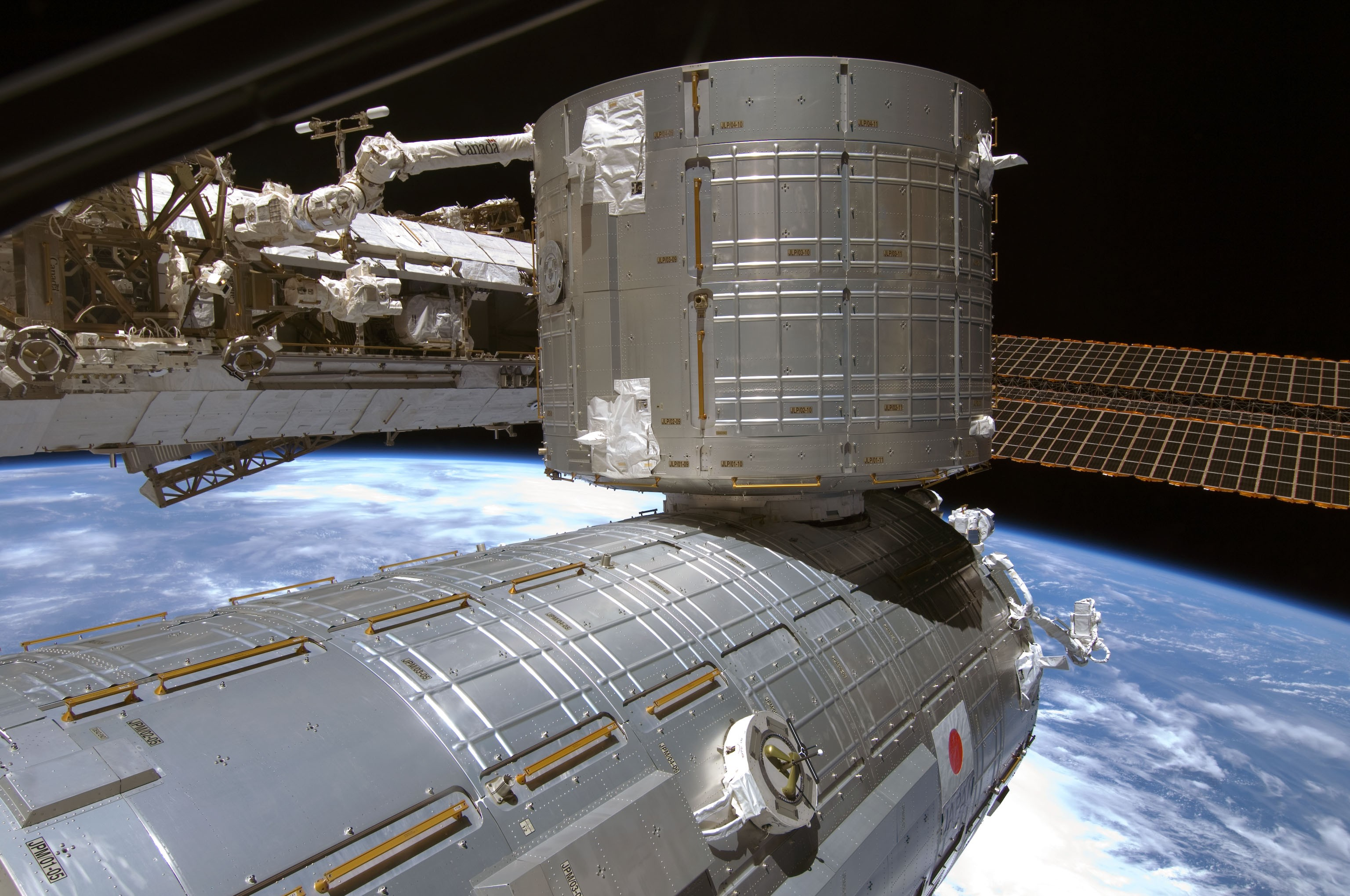
Japanese Experiment Module

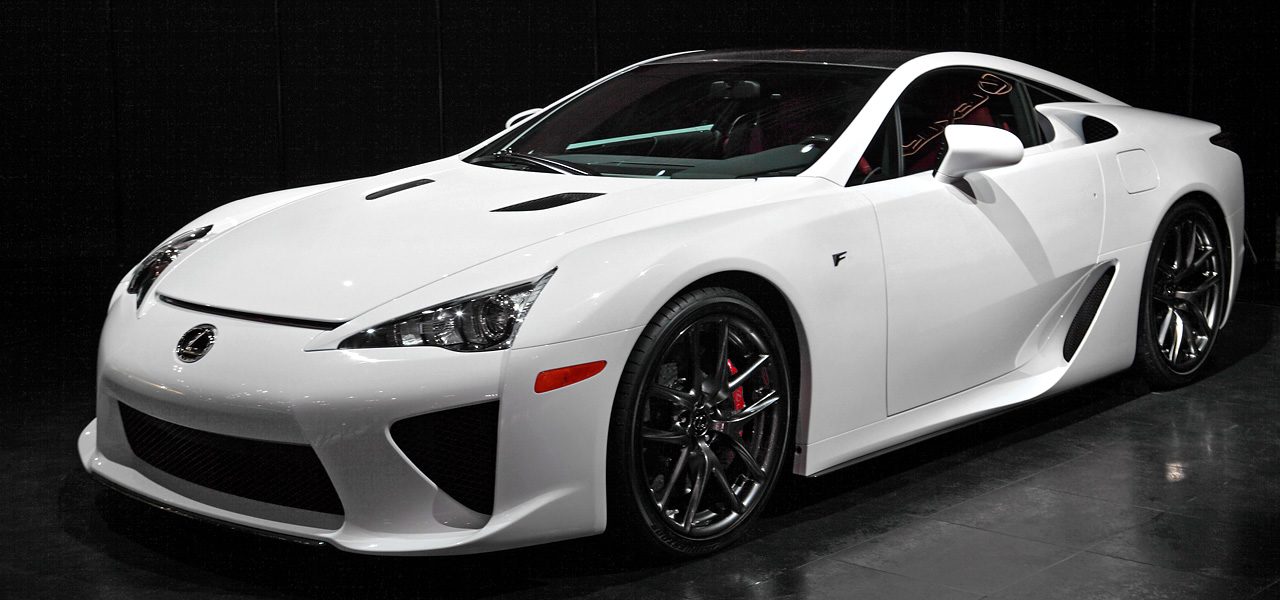
Lexus LFA

Science and technology in Japan has helped fuel the rapid industrial and economic development of the country. Japan has a long history and tradition for research and development, stretching as far back as the Meiji period.

However, science and technology developed rapidly after the Second World War, which has affected the advancement of vehicle technology, consumer electronics, robotics, medical devices, space exploration, and film industry. Japan's educational system as well as its higher education institutions help contribute to the country's acceptance for technological innovation and aid engineering talent development.

High levels of support for research and development have enabled Japan to produce advances in automotive engines, television display technology, video games, optical clocks, and many other fields. Japan is also advanced and a global leader in the robotics, natural sciences, aerospace exploration and biomedical research areas. In 2025, Japan was ranked 12th in the Global Innovation Index by the World Intellectual Property Organization, and remained in the same position in the index of 2026. Scientific research in Japan is supported and promoted by the Japanese Government through various institutes and agencies including the Japan Science and Technology Agency (科学技術振興機構), Science Council of Japan (日本学術会議) and the Japan Academy (日本学士院).

== Aerospace research ==
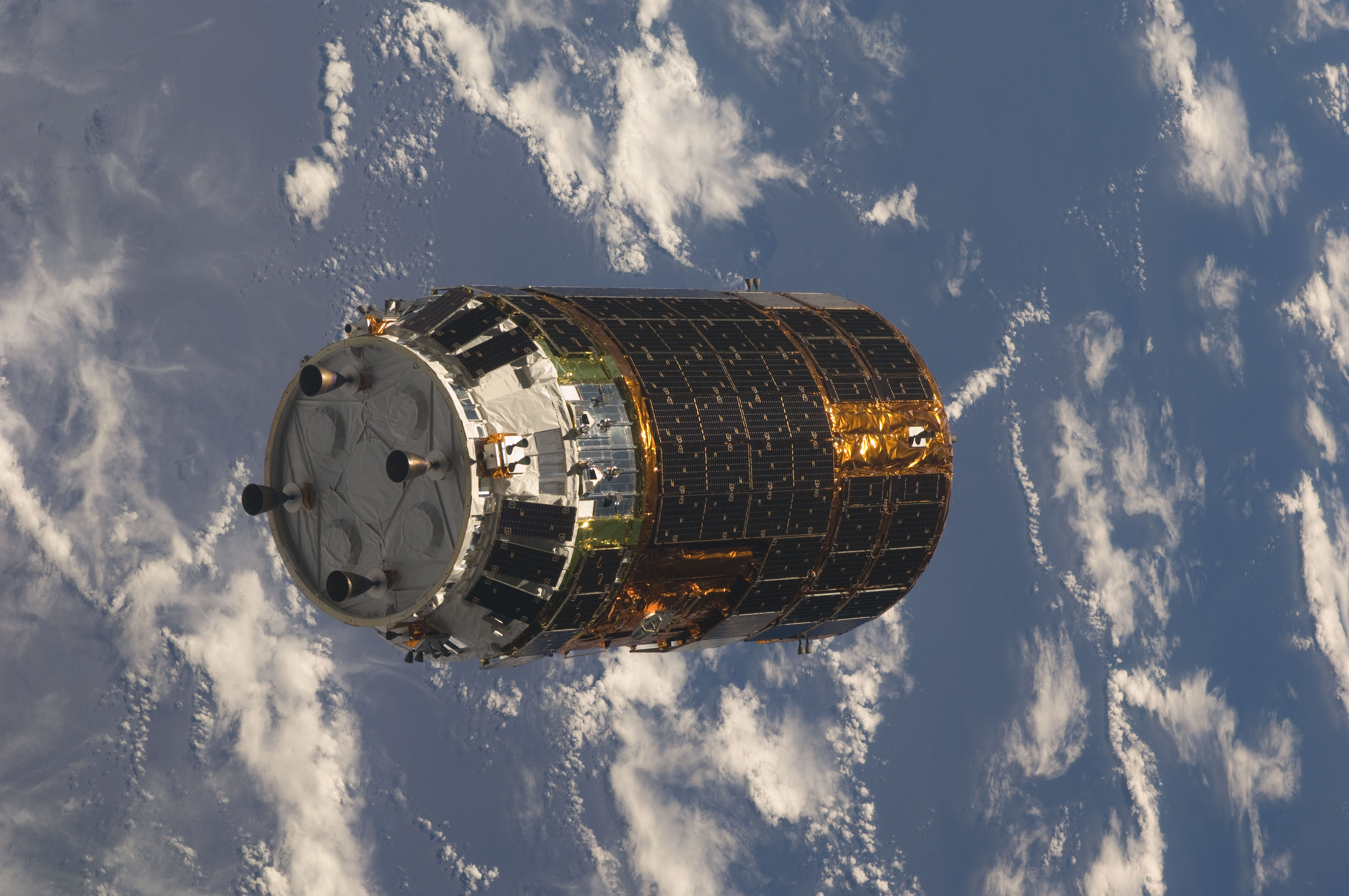
H-II Transfer Vehicle

Founded in 2003 through the merging of three aerospace organisations (Institute of Space and Astronautical Science, National Aerospace Laboratory, and the National Space Development Agency of Japan), the Japan Aerospace Exploration Agency (JAXA) conducts space and planetary exploration, aviation research, and the development of various space technologies and satellites. JAXA has developed a series of rockets in conjunction with Japanese heavy manufacturers such as Mitsubishi Heavy Industries. The organisation was also responsible for the development of the Japanese Experiment Module (also known as KIBO), which was launched and added to the International Space Station during Space Shuttle assembly flights in 2007 and 2008 and the HTV to transfer payloads to the station in 2009.

Japan also sends several astronauts to work in the ISS and help other international collaborators with space research and technology transfers. Since 1990, twelve Japanese individuals have participated in space flights, two of whom were women. Two Japanese astronauts also served as commanders of the ISS, with the last being Akihiko Hoshide.

In recent years, Japan's Hayabusa2 spacecraft has been used to collect samples from a near-Earth asteroid called Ryugu and back to Earth for research and analysis. The 6-year mission ended in 2020.

== Nuclear energy ==
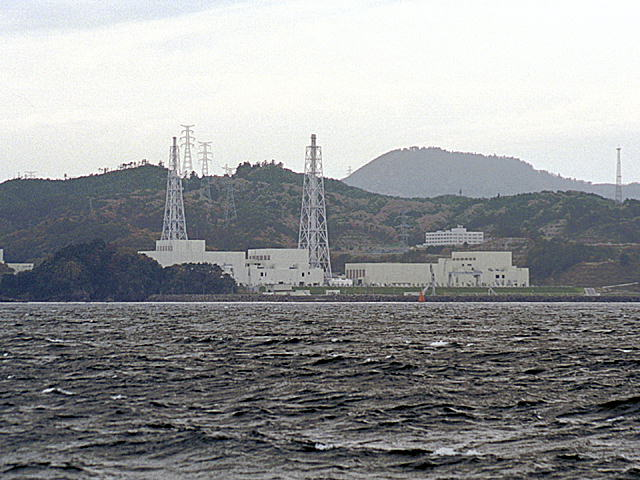
The Onagawa Nuclear Power Plant, a 3-unit BWR site typical of Japan's nuclear plants

Since 1973, Japan has been looking to become less dependent on imported fuel and start to depend on nuclear energy. In 2008, after the opening of 7 brand new nuclear reactors in Japan (3 on Honshū, and 1 each on Hokkaidō, Kyūshū, Shikoku, and Tanegashima) Japan became the third largest nuclear power user in the world with 55 nuclear reactors. These provide 34.5% of Japan's electricity.

Following an earthquake, tsunami, and the failure of cooling systems at the Fukushima I Nuclear Power Plant on March 11, 2011, a nuclear emergency was declared. 140,000 residents within 20 km of the plant were evacuated. See Radiation effects from Fukushima Daiichi nuclear disaster 900.

== Electronics ==
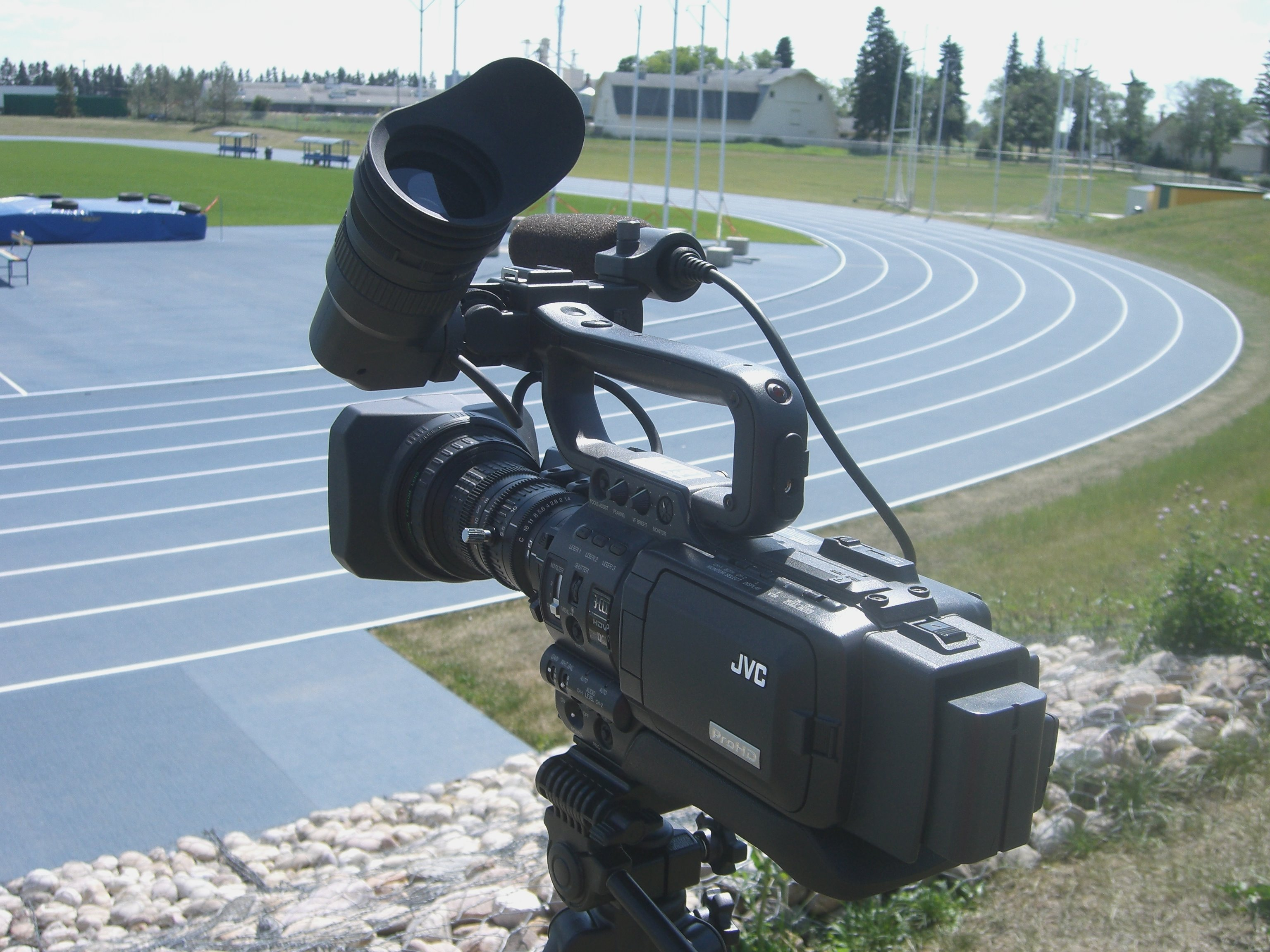
PRO-HDV JVC camera

Japan is well known for its electronics industry throughout the world, and Japanese electronic products account for a large share in the world market, compared to a majority of other countries. Japan is one of the leading nations in the fields of scientific research, technology, machinery, and medical research with the world's third largest budget for research and development at 130 billion USD, and over 677,731 researchers. Japan has received the most science Nobel Prizes in Asia (see List of Nobel laureates by country)

Japan has large international corporate conglomerates such as Fuji (which developed the nation's first electronic computer, FUJIC1999, in 1956) and Sony. Sony, Panasonic, Canon, Fujitsu, Hitachi, Sharp, NEC, Nintendo, Epson and Toshiba are among the best-known electronics companies in the world. Toyota, Honda, Nissan, Mazda, Mitsubishi, Suzuki, and Subaru are also very well known automobile companies in the world.

It is estimated that compared to the amount of known reserves still in the ground, 16% of the world's gold and 22% of silver is contained in electronic technology in Japan.

== Robotics ==
Japan is also known for robotics. There are many types of robots that are used in restaurants, hospitals, parks, or in different companies. Robots are used for different purposes, such as in restaurants in Japan. Japanese research companies are researching on advanced AI robots that can mimic the work of humans.

== Medicine and healthcare ==
Japan is also a global leader in the area of biomedical research along with the United States and elsewhere. In 2015, the country established the Japan Agency for Medical Research and Development to help implement biomedical research and development projects and improve the support infrastructure for clinical research. Medical research in Japan typically takes place in various national university and private university research hospitals. These research hospitals include University of Tokyo Hospital, Tohoku University Hospital, and Keio University Hospital among others.

== Ten Japanese Great Inventors ==
On the centennial anniversary of the creation of the industrial rights system in 1985, the Japan Patent Office selected ten Japanese inventors whose inventions helped contribute to Japan's rapid industrial development and scientific research. These inventors are:

- Sakichi Toyoda (豊田佐吉): Patent no. 1195, human-powered wooden weaving machine
- Kokichi Mikimoto (御木本幸吉): Patent no. 2670, cultured pearl
- Jokichi Takamine (高峰譲吉): Patent no. 4785, adrenaline
- Kikunae Ikeda (池田菊苗): Patent no. 14805, sodium glutamate
- Umetaro Suzuki (鈴木梅太郎): Patent no. 20785, vitamin B1
- Kyota Sugimoto (杉本京太): Patent no. 27877, Japanese typewriter
- Kotaro Honda (本多光太郎): Patent no. 32334, KS steel
- Hidetsugi Yagi (八木秀次): Patent no. 69115, Yagi-Uda antenna
- Yasujiro Niwa (丹羽保次郎): Patent no. 84722, Phototelegraphy Method
- Tokushichi Mishima (三島徳七): Patent Number 96371, MKM steel

== See also ==
- History of science and technology in Japan
- Japanese automotive industry
- Neodymium magnet
- List of Japanese inventions
- Research and development in Japan
