= CSMT =

‘’’CSMT’’’ may stand for:

- MOS composite static induction thyristor
- Chhatrapati Shivaji Terminus, officially Chhatrapati Shivaji Maharaj Terminus, in Mumbai, India
- Chhatrapati Shahu Maharaj Terminus, in Kolhapur, India
