= Japan Science and Technology Agency =

Japanese government agency

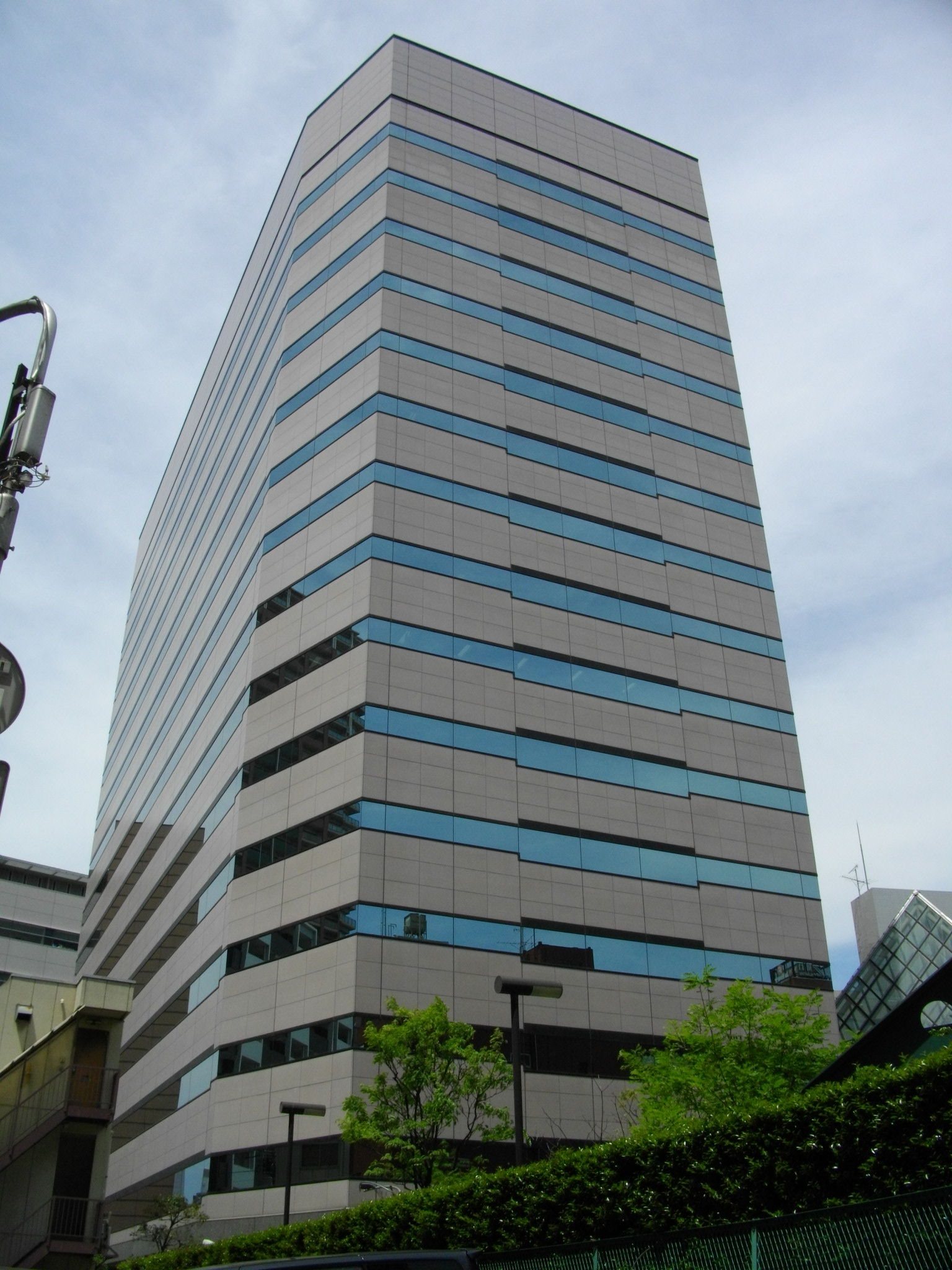
Head office, Kawaguchi Center Building

The Japan Science and Technology Agency (JST; Japanese: 科学技術振興機構) is a Japanese government agency which aims to build infrastructure that supports knowledge creation and dissemination in Japan. It is one of the National Research and Development Agencies, overseen by the Ministry of Education, Culture, Sports, Science and Technology (MEXT) and the Council for Science, Technology and Innovation (CSTI). It operates from headquarters in Kawaguchi, Saitama, in the Greater Tokyo Area, and in Chiyoda in central Tokyo.

The agency formed in 2003, as successor to the Japan Science and Technology Corporation. The corporation had formed in 1996 through the merging of the Japan Information Center of Science and Technology (JICST, est. 1957) and the Research Development Corporation of Japan (JRDC, est. 1961).

Among other activities, the agency runs J-STAGE, an "electronic journal platform for science and technology information in Japan," and publishes the Journal of Information Processing and Management (ISSN 1347-1597). As a funder of research, the agency requires its grantees to follow its policy on open access and open science. It has now made operational Jxiv, preprints server in Japan.

The Sakura Science Program is an international exchange initiative by the Japan Science and Technology Agency (JST) that brings researchers, students, and science professionals from abroad to experience science and technology in Japan.

Milan Kumar Rai -Engineering Geologist, Nepal; Sakura Science Exchange Program participant (Earth Science / Engineering Geology) attended as a coordinator and presenter for the Sakura Science Club Nepal.

== Directors ==
- Kinji Moriyama, 1973–1974
- Ichiro Nakagawa, 1980–1982
- Michinari Hamaguchi, 2015–2022
- Kazuhito Hashimoto, 2022–present

== See also ==
- Science and technology in Japan
- List of Independent Administrative Institutes in Japan
- Research and development in Japan
- SATREPS
