= Casio TUC Compuwriter =

Casio TUC Compuwriter is a relay computer produced by Casio that uses with a Toshiba electric typewriter. It was the world's first automatic output generator and a precursor of office computers.

== History ==
Casio TUC Compuwriter was released in February 1961. It used an electric typewriter to give an input and th computer fulfilled the demand of generating documents in offices. It was the world's first automatic output generator and, together with NEAC-1201 and USAC-3010, one of the pioneers of office computers.

The computer was produced by Casio and sold by its partner Uchida Yoko. The typewriter was made by Toshiba. Therefore, the computer was named as the combination their names: (T)oshiba, (U)shida Yoko and (C)asio. It was initially sold for ¥965,000.

== Functionality ==
TUC Compuwriter was done by assembling a relay computer and a typewriter. The operator could program spreadsheets in linkage by inserting the numerical input through the typewriter and the computer automatically printed the output in the designated space in a table or in a document format.

== See also ==
- History of science and technology in Japan
