= SATREPS =

SATREPS (Science and Technology Research Partnership for Sustainable Development, 地球規模課題対応国際科学技術協力) is a Japanese government program that promotes international joint research targeting global issues. The program is a collaboration between two Japanese government agencies: the Japan Science and Technology Agency (JST) and the Japan International Cooperation Agency (JICA). SATREPS projects are expected to lead to outcomes with potential for practical utilization, and to enhance research capacity in the developing countries all around the world. Some of the global challenges cannot be met by a single country or region acting on its own, so engagement by the international community is essential. To address these issues, SATREPS works through international projects by developing partnerships among researchers in Japan and researchers in developing countries.

Distribution of ongoing projects

SATREPS projects are selected each year from project proposals developed together with partner institutions in the developing countries and submitted by Japanese research institutions. In the four years since its commencements in April 2008, a total of 60 projects are in developed in 33 countries:

Region	Number of Countries	Number of Projects
Asia	10 countries	31 projects
Latin America/Caribbean	6 countries	9 projects
Africa	15 countries	18 projects
Other	2 countries	2 projects

The framework

SATREPS projects are conducted through collaboration between JST and JICA. JST uses research contracts to support research costs incurred inside Japan and possibly some other locations excluding the country involved in the project. JICA provides support through its technical cooperation project framework to cover costs in the country involved in the collaborative project. Overall R&D management of the international joint research is handled jointly by JST, which has expertise in funding research projects at research institutions in Japan, and JICA, which has expertise in technical cooperation in developing countries.

SATREPS projects typically share the following characteristics:

Joint research conducted for the purpose of resolving specific issues, where there is a strong need to enhance research capacity in the developing country involved in the project.
Research with outcomes expected to contribute to both the developing country and the wider community.
Research expected to contribute to the advancement of Japan's science and technology

Possible potential collaboration topics

- Research contributing to adaptation to climate change or mitigation of climate change
- Research contributing to the acquisition and treatment of safe water supplies
- Research contributing to the secure management of chemical risks
- Research contributing to the development of a closed-loop economy
- Research contributing to biodiversity and ecosystem conservation, including bio-remedies.
