= Static induction transistor =

Type of junction-gate field effect transistor

The static induction transistor (SIT) is a type of field-effect transistor (FET) capable of high-speed and high-power operation, with low distortion and low noise. It is a vertical structure device with short multichannel. The device was originally known as a VFET, with V being short for vertical. Being a vertical device, the SIT structure offers advantages in obtaining higher breakdown voltages than a conventional FET. For the SIT, the breakdown voltage is not limited by the surface breakdown between gate and drain, allowing it to operate at a very high current and voltage. The SIT has a current-voltage characteristic similar to a vacuum tube triode and it was therefore used in high-end audio products, including power amplifiers from Sony in the second half of the 1970s and Yamaha from 1973-1980. The Sony n-channel SIT had the model number 2SK82 with its p-channel complement named 2SJ28.

== Characteristics ==
A SIT has:

- short channel length
- low gate series resistance
- low gate-source capacitance
- small thermal resistance
- low noise
- low distortion
- high audio frequency power capability
- short turn-on and turn-off time, typically 0.25 μs

== History ==
The SIT was invented by Japanese engineers Jun-ichi Nishizawa and Y. Watanabe in 1950.

== See also ==
- SIT-based Audio devices
- Static induction thyristor
- JFET
