= Static induction thyristor =

Type of thyristor device

The static induction thyristor (SIT, SITh) is a thyristor with a buried gate structure in which the gate electrodes are placed in n-base region. Since they are normally on-state, gate electrodes must be negatively or anode biased to hold off-state. It has low noise, low distortion, high audio frequency power capability. The turn-on and turn-off times are very short, typically 0.25 microseconds.

== History ==
The first static induction thyristor was invented by Japanese engineer Jun-ichi Nishizawa in 1975. It was capable of conducting large currents with a low forward bias and had a small turn-off time. It had a self controlled gate turn-off thyristor that was commercially available through Tokyo Electric Co. (now Toyo Engineering Corporation) in 1988. The initial device consisted of a p+nn+ diode and a buried p+ grid.

In 1999, an analytical model of the SITh was developed for the PSPICE circuit simulator. In 2010, a newer version of SITh was developed by Zhang Caizhen, Wang Yongshun, Liu Chunjuan and Wang Zaixing, the new feature of which was its high forward blocking voltage.

== See also ==
- Static induction transistor
- MOS composite static induction thyristor
