= Shimajigawa Dam =

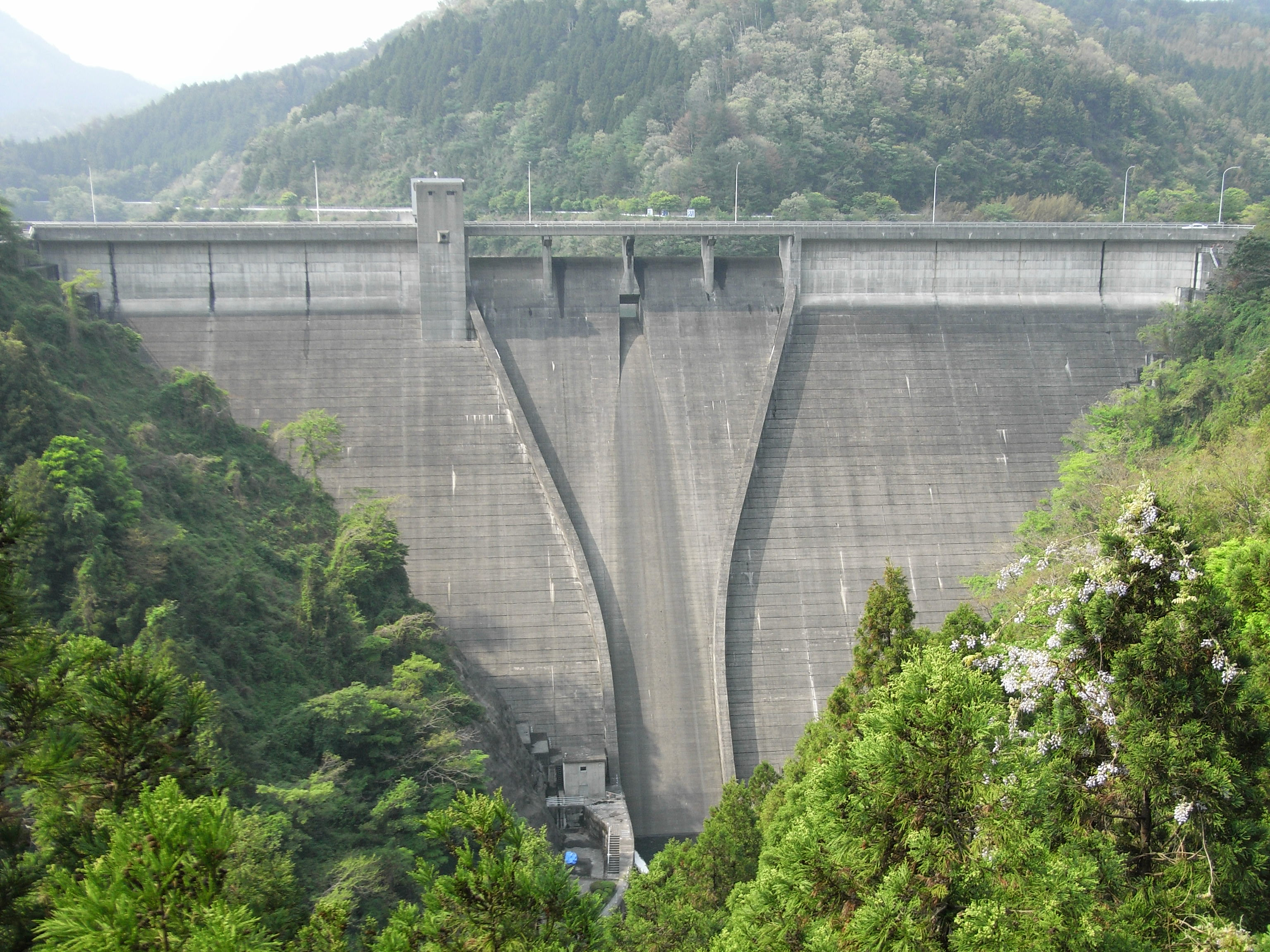

- Location within Japan
- Country: Japan
- Location: Shūnan, Yamaguchi
- Coordinates: 34°10′13″N 131°46′31″E
- Status: Operational
- Construction began: 1978
- Opening date: 1980

Dam and spillways
- Type of dam: Concrete gravity
- Impounds: Shimaji River
- Height: 89 m (292 ft)
- Length: 240 m (787 ft)
- Dam volume: 317,000 m^{3} (414,620 cu yd)

Reservoir
- Creates: Lake Takase
- Total capacity: 20,600,000 m^{3} (16,701 acre⋅ft)
- Active capacity: 19,600,000 m^{3} (15,890 acre⋅ft)
- Catchment area: 32 km^{2} (12 sq mi)
- Surface area: 80 ha (198 acres)

The Shimajigawa Dam is a concrete gravity dam on the Shimaji River 13 km (8 mi) north of Shūnan in Yamaguchi Prefecture, Japan. The dam was completed in 1980 and was the first dam to be completely constructed with the roller-compacted concrete method. The dam creates Takase Lake.
