= Jun-ichi Nishizawa =

Japanese physicist (1926–2018)

Jun-ichi Nishizawa 西澤 潤一
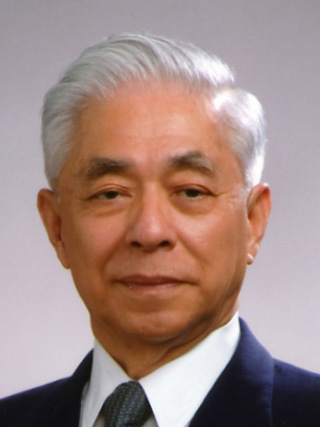
- Born: September 12, 1926; Sendai, Miyagi Prefecture, Japan
- Died: October 21, 2018 (aged 92); Sendai, Miyagi Prefecture, Japan
- Education: Tohoku University
- Awards: Japan Academy Prize (1974); IEEE Jack A. Morton Award (1983); Order of Culture (1989); IEEE Edison Medal (2000)
- Scientific career
- Workplaces: Tohoku University; Iwate Prefectural University; Tokyo Metropolitan University; Sophia University

Layers of a PIN diode. (+ -) The PIN photodiode was invented by Jun-ichi Nishizawa in 1950.

Jun-ichi Nishizawa (西澤 潤一, Nishizawa Jun'ichi; September 12, 1926 – October 21, 2018) was a Japanese engineer and inventor. He is known for his electronic inventions since the 1950s, including the PIN diode, static induction transistor, static induction thyristor, SIT/SITh. His inventions contributed to the development of internet technology and the Information Age. He was a professor at Sophia University.

== Biography ==
Nishizawa was born in Sendai, Japan, on September 12, 1926. He earned a B.S. in 1948, and a Doctor of Engineering degree in 1960, from Tohoku University.

In 1953, he joined the Research Institute of Electrical Communication at Tohoku University. He became a professor there and was appointed director to two research institutes. From 1990 to 1996, Nishizawa served as the President of Tohoku University.

He became the president of Iwate Prefectural University in 1998.

=== Research ===
In 1950, the static induction transistor was invented by Jun-ichi Nishizawa and Y. Watanabe. The PIN photodiode was also invented by Nishizawa and his colleagues in 1950. In 1952, he invented the avalanche photodiode.

While working at Tohoku University, he proposed fiber-optic communication, the use of optical fibers for optical communication, in 1963. Nishizawa invented other technologies in the 1960s that contributed to the development of optical fiber communications, such as the graded-index optical fiber as a channel for transmitting light from semiconductor lasers. He patented the graded-index optical fiber in 1964.

In 1971, he invented the static induction thyristor.

== Recognition ==
Nishizawa was a Life Fellow of the IEEE. He is a Fellow of several other institutions, including the Physical Society, the Russian Academy of Sciences, and the Polish Academy of Sciences. Nishizawa was decorated with Order of Culture by the emperor of Japan in 1989. He also received the Japan Academy Prize (1974), IEEE Jack A. Morton Award (1983), the Honda Prize (1986), and the Laudise Prize of the International Organization for Crystal Growth (1989). IEEE conferred the Edison Medal on him in 2000, and introduced the IEEE Jun-ichi Nishizawa Medal in 2002. He has more than a thousand patents registered under his name.
