= Waco (toymaker) =

Japanese toy company

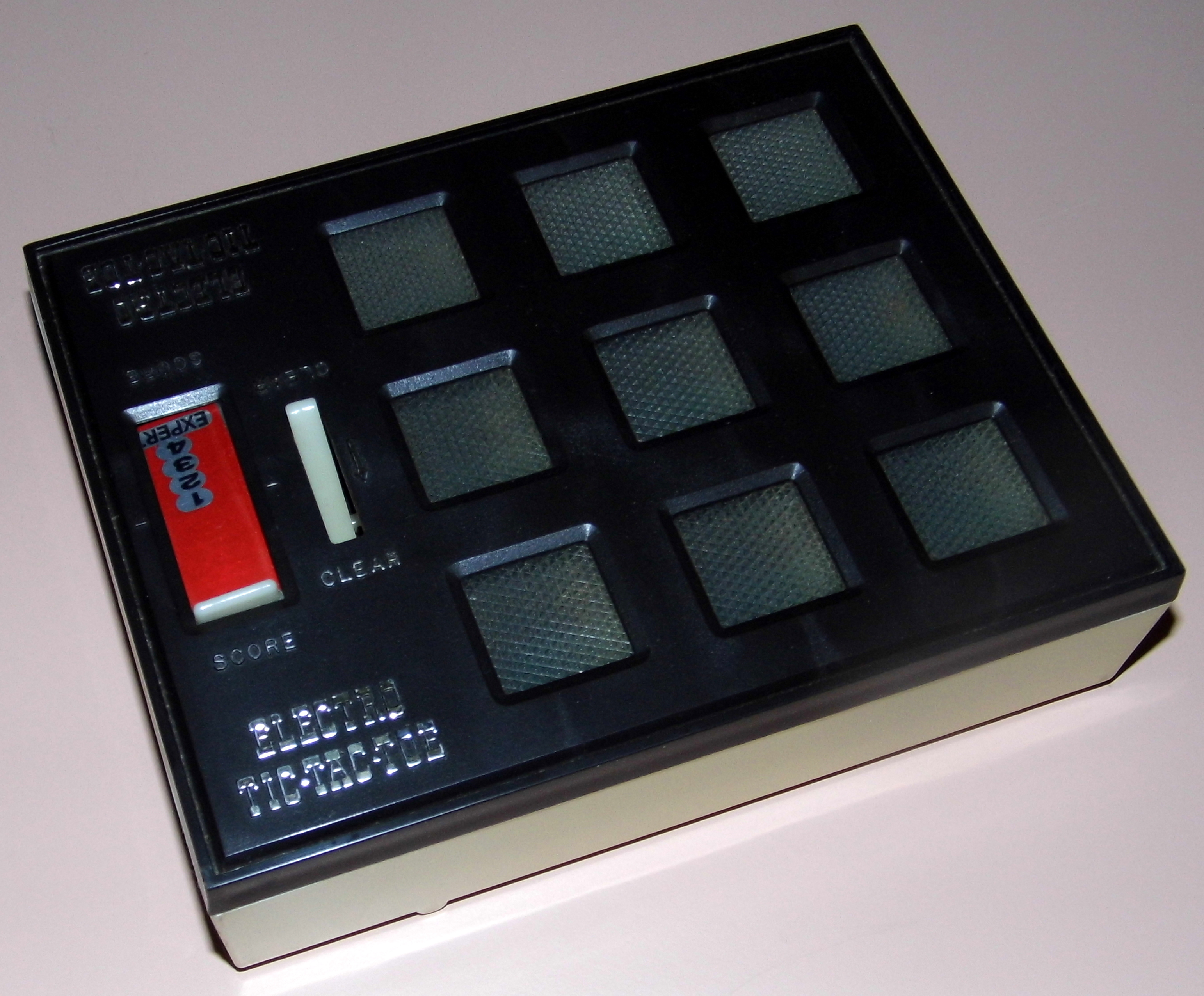
The Electro Tic-Tac-Toe game by Waco, 1972

Waco was a Japanese toy manufacturer. It was known for manufacturing the handheld game Electro Tic-Tac-Toe. Released in 1972, the game is commonly cited as the first commercially available handheld electronic game. However some sources do not consider the Electro Tic-Tac-Toe to be the first handheld electronic game.

The game was designed for two players.

== See also ==
- History of computer and video games
- First video game
- Handheld game console
- Tic-tac-toe
