= Satake Corporation =

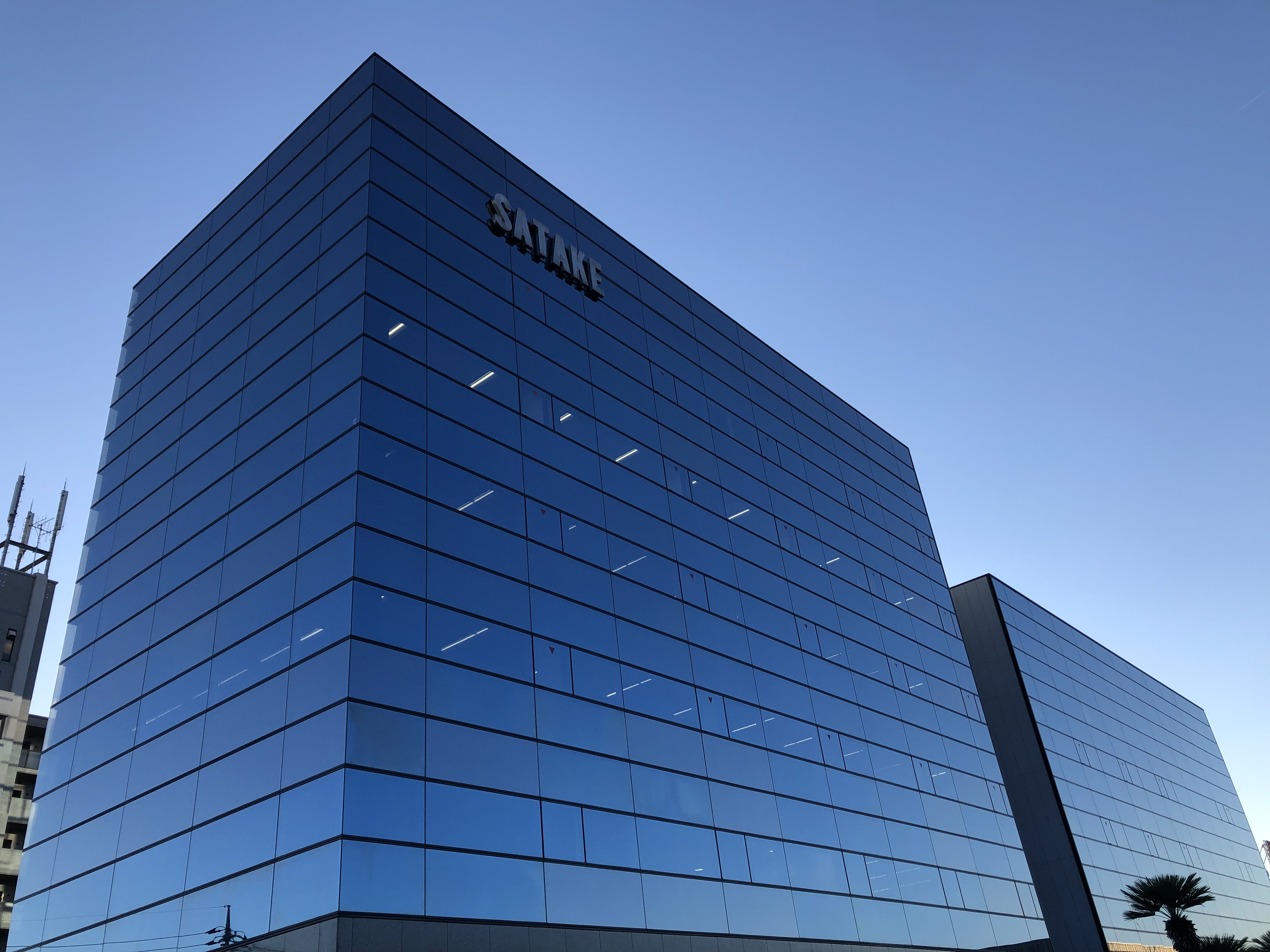
- Company type: Private
- Industry: Manufacturings
- Founded: 1939; 87 years ago
- Headquarters: Hiroshima, Japan
- Area served: Worldwide
- Products: Rice milling machines

Satake Corporation (株式会社サタケ) based in Hiroshima, Japan, is a multinational company mainly focused in equipment for the processing and sorting of agricultural products such as rice, grains and beans. The corporation was founded in Japan by Riichi Satake in 1896. They have now expanded into plastics, acquiring an American company, Electronic Sorting Machines (ESM), that specializes in optical sorting equipment for nuts, plastics, vegetables, and seeds.

Three generations of Satake have received the Japanese Blue Ribbon award for advances in food processing.

Currently Satake Corp. is under the chairmanship of Toshiko Satake, granddaughter of Riichi Satake, and the fourth President of the company. In 2007 the company founded Satake International Bangkok Co., Ltd. They also have offices in the United Kingdom and Australia.

== History ==
Key events in the company's history.

- 1896 Riichi Satake invents and initiates the production and sales of Japan's first power driven rice milling machine, founding the company, and becoming its first president.
- 1940 Toshihiko Satake (the second President) publishes "The Theory of Rice Milling." This work is the basis from which the rice processing technology of today has evolved.
- 1955 The Pearlmaster Rice Milling Machine is invented. Practically 100% of the mills in Japan adopted this machine and is the first rice milling machine to be exported from post war Japan, the beginning of its dominance in the industry.
- 1966 Develops the Tempering Dryer that dries rice up to ten times faster than previous dryers.
- 1986 The Company develops the world's first rice taste analysis instrument, the Taste Analyzer.
- 1989 The Company unveils the world's first high starting torque with low stating current, three-phase, alternating current motor.
- 1991 Satake UK Ltd. established through the acquisition of Robinson/Simon to secure a foothold in the EU market. Its location is shared with ESM UK, a residual branch of ESM.
- 1992 Satake USA Inc. is established in Houston by the acquisition of ESM, a long time sorting machine producer.
- 1997 Centennial of Satake Corporation.
- 1998 Toshihiko Satake passes, and Robert S. Satake (related by marriage) assumes Chairmanship. Satake Manufacturing (Suzhou) Co., Ltd. begins operations in China.
- 1999 Satake America Latina Ltda. is established in Porto Alegre, Brazil.
- 2000 Robert S. Satake is honored with the Order of the Rising Sun, Gold and Silver Rays for his achievements in promoting the advancement of science and technology for his efforts in introducing several advances in the industry. Unfortunately he also suddenly dies the same year.
- 2001 Toshiko Satake, the daughter of Toshihiko Satake and wife of Robert S. Satake, becomes the fourth president of the company. Is awarded an Honorary Doctorate from Hiroshima University.
- 2007 Establishment of Satake International Bangkok Co., Ltd.
- 2010 Satake Europe Limited is established in Manchester, UK.
- 2012 The company forms a comprehensive partnership with DAEWON GSI Co., Ltd in Korea.
