= Research and development in Japan =

As a global leader in the automotive, robotics, and electronics industries that has made significant contributions to science and technology, Japan has consistently prioritized research and development since the late 20th century in order to maintain its position at the forefront of technological developments.

Research and development became increasingly important to the Japanese economy through the 1970s and 1980s and obtained significant support from the Japanese government.

Relative to gross domestic product, Japan's research and development budget is the second highest in the world, with 867,000 researchers sharing a 19-trillion-yen research and development budget as of 2017.

== Growth ==
As its economy matured in the 1970s and 1980s, Japan gradually shifted away from dependence on foreign research. Japan's ability to conduct independent research and development became a decisive factor in boosting the nation's competitiveness. As early as 1980, the Japan Science and Technology Agency, a component of the Kantei (office of the Prime Minister) announced the beginning of "the era of Japan's technological independence."

By 1986 Japan had come to devote a higher proportion of its GNP to research and development than the United States. In 1989 nearly 700,000 Japanese were engaged in research and development, more than the number of French, British, and West Germans combined. At the same time, Japan was producing more engineers than any country except the United States and Soviet Union. Similar trends were seen in the use of capital resources. Japan spent US$39.1 billion on government and private research and development in 1987, equivalent to 2.9 percent of its national income (the highest ratio in the world). Although the United States spent around US$108.2 billion on research and development in 1987, only 2.6 percent of its income was devoted to that purpose, ranking it third behind Japan and West Germany.

The Japanese reputation for originality also increased. Of the 1.2 million patents registered worldwide in 1985, 40 percent were Japanese, and Japanese citizens took out 19 percent of the 120,000 patent applications made in the United States. In 1987 around 33 percent of computer-related patents in the United States were Japanese, as were 30 percent of aviation-related patents and 26 percent of communications patents.

== Government initiatives ==
Despite its advances in technological research and development and its major commitment to applied research, however, Japan significantly trailed other developed nations in basic scientific research. In 1989 about 13 percent of Japanese research and development funds were devoted to basic research. The proportion of basic research expenses borne by government was also much lower in Japan than in the United States, as was Japan's ratio of basic research expenses to GNP. In the late 1980s, the Japanese government attempted to rectify national deficiencies in basic research by waging a broad "originality" campaign in schools, by generously funding research, and by encouraging private cooperation in various fields.

Most research and development is private, although government support to universities and laboratories aid industry greatly. In 1986 private industry provided 76 percent of the funding for research and development, which was especially strong in the late 1980s in electrical machinery (with a ratio of research costs to total sales of 5.5 percent in 1986), precision instruments (4.6 percent), chemicals (4.3 percent), and transportation equipment (3.2 percent).

As for government research and development, the national commitment to greater defense spending in the 1980s translated into increased defense-related research and development. Meanwhile, government moved away from supporting large-scale industrial technology, such as shipbuilding and steel. Research emphases in the 1980s were in alternative energy, information processing, life sciences, and modern industrial materials and supplies.

== Current situation ==
In 2016, the total spending on R&D in Japan was US$165.7 billion by PPP, which represents around 3% of the country's PPP-adjusted GDP.

== Sources ==
- Social Research Collaboration Tool for Researchers
- - Dolan, R. E. & Worden, R. L. (1992) Japan: A Country Study. Washington, D.C.: Federal Research Division, Library of Congress: For sale by the Superintendent of Documents, U.S. Govt. Print. Off. [Pdf] Retrieved from the Library of Congress, https://www.loc.gov/item/91029874/.
