= Yasujiro Niwa =

Japanese electrical scientist

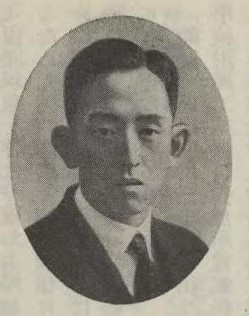
Yasujiro Niwa

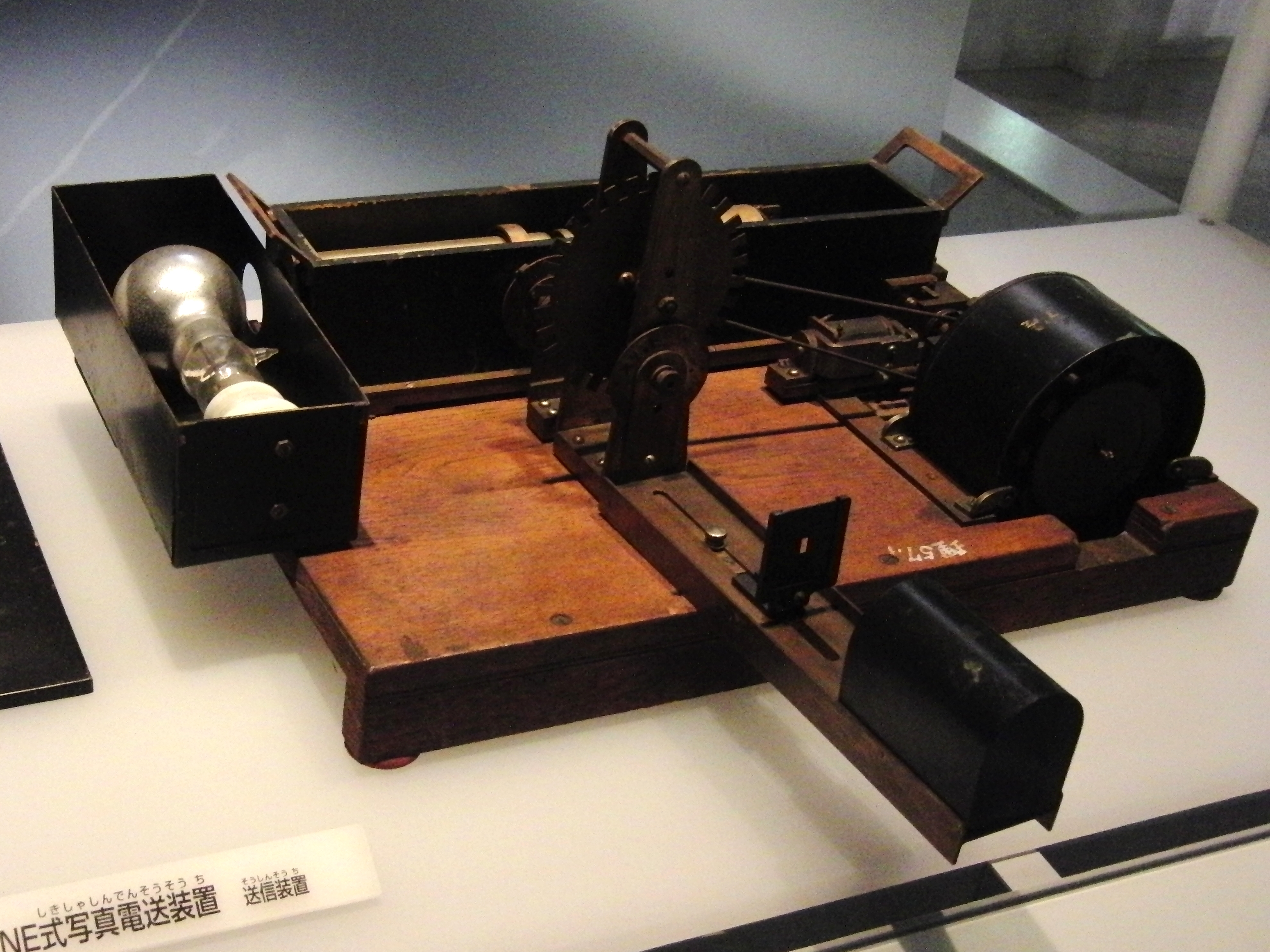
Transmitter of NE-type phototelegraphic system (Fax). Exhibit in the National Museum of Nature and Science, Tokyo, Japan.

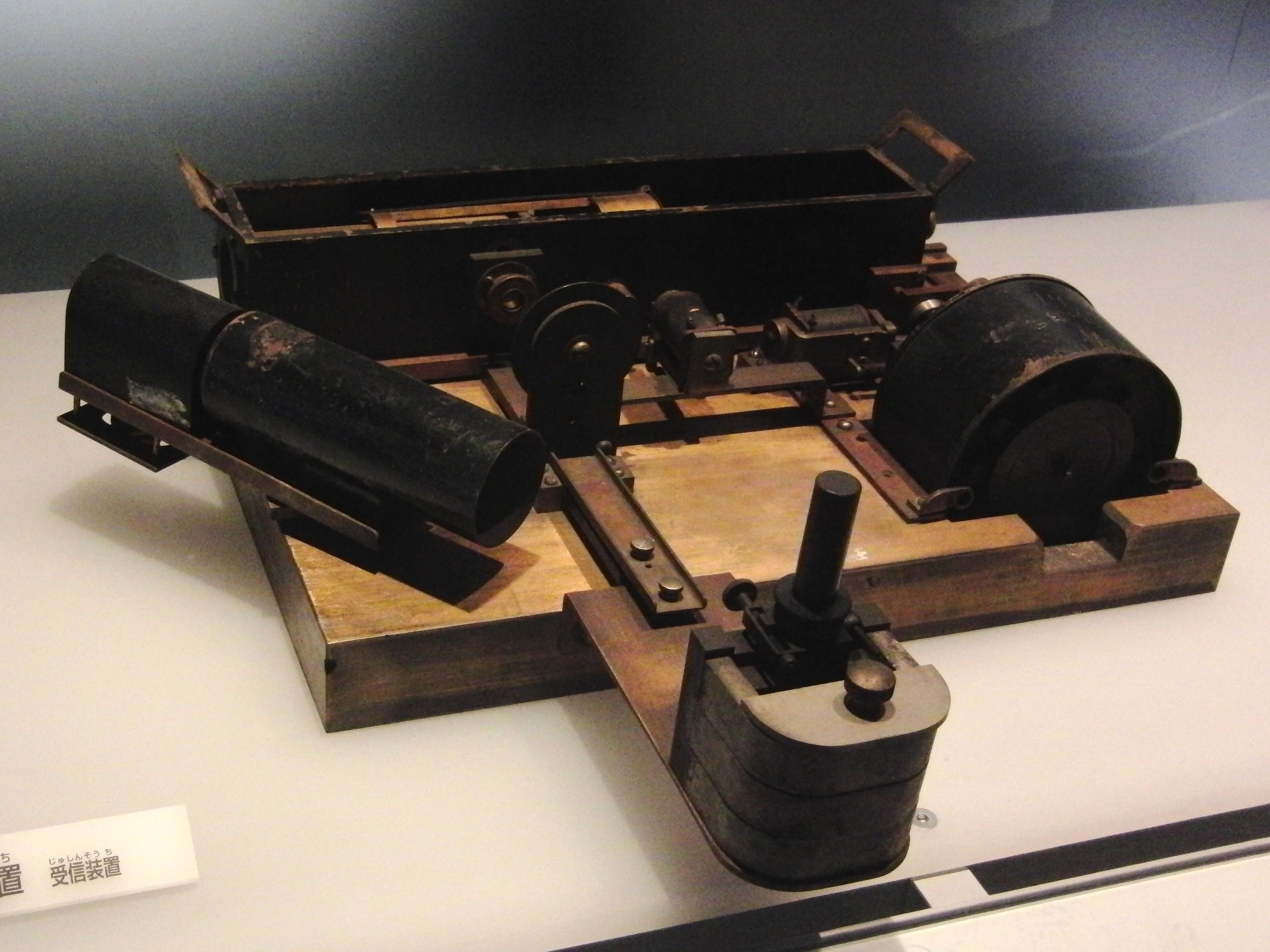
Receiver of NE-type phototelegraphic system (Fax). Exhibit in the National Museum of Nature and Science, Tokyo, Japan.

Yasujiro Niwa (丹羽 保次郎, Niwa Yasujirō; April 1, 1893 – February 28, 1975) was a Japanese electrical scientist from Matsusaka, Mie. In the 1920s, he invented a simple device for phototelegraphic transmission through cable and later via radio, a technology that contributed to the development of mechanical television in Japan. He later became the Director of the Department of Electronic Engineering at the University of Tokyo. He was awarded the Order of Cultural Merits and the Grand Cordon of the Order of the Sacred Treasure.

On April 18, 1985, the Japan Patent Office selected him as one of Ten Japanese Great Inventors.
