= Addo (surname) =

Addo is a Ghanaian surname. Notable people with the (Asante, Ga and Akuapim dialect) surname include:

- Aaron Addo Dankwah (born 1993), Ghanaian footballer
- Adeline Akufo-Addo (1917–2004), Nana Akufo-Addo's mother
- Addoquaye Addo (born 1985), Ghanaian footballer
- Charles Addo Odametey (1937–2006), Ghanaian footballer
- Daniel Addo (footballer, born 1976), Ghanaian footballer
- Daniel Addo (footballer, born 1987), Ghanaian footballer
- Daniel Addo (soldier), Ghanaian soldier and politician
- Daniel Ashley Addo (born 1989), Ghanaian footballer
- David Addo (born 1983), Ghanaian footballer
- Ebenezer Kwadwo Teye Addo, Ghanaian politician
- Edmund Addo (born 2000), Ghanaian football player
- Edward Akufo-Addo (1906–1979), lawyer, former president of Ghana
- Elijah Amoo Addo (born 1990), Ghanaian chef
- Elizabeth Addo (born 1993), Ghanaian footballer
- Emmanuel Nii Akwei Addo (1943–2017), Ghanaian lawyer
- Eric Addo (born 1978), Ghanaian footballer
- Farah Weheliye Addo (1935/1940–2008), Somali sports administrator
- Felix E. Addo (born 1955), Ghanaian executive
- Frimpong Yaw Addo (born 1962), Ghanaian politician
- G. Bedu-Addo, Ghanaian naval officer
- Grace Addo (born 1960), Ghanaian politician
- Herbert Addo (1951–2017), Ghanaian association football manager
- Irene Naa Torshie Addo (born 1970), Ghanaian politician
- Ishmael Addo (born 1982), Ghanaian footballer
- Joan Anim-Addo, Grenadian poet
- Joe Addo (born 1971), Ghanaian footballer
- Joseph Addo (footballer born 1990) (born 1990), Ghanaian footballer
- Josephine Hilda Addo, Ghanaian politician
- Joyce Bamford-Addo (born 1937), Ghanaian judge and politician
- J. S. Addo, Ghanaian economist
- Julius Sarkodee-Addo (1908–1972), Ghanaian judge
- Kwaku Sakyi-Addo, Ghanaian journalist
- Kwakye Addo (born 1951), Ghanaian politician
- Kwame Addo-Kufuor (born 1940), Ghanaian politician and physician
- Marylyn Addo (born 1970), German virologist
- Mercy Bampo Addo, Ghanaian diplomat
- Nana Akua Addo, Ghanaian model
- Nana Akufo-Addo (born 1944), Ghanaian lawyer and politician
- Osman Addo (born 2004), Danish footballer
- Otto Addo (born 1975), Ghanaian-German footballer
- Paul Addo (born 1990), Ghanaian footballer
- Ransford Addo (born 1983), Ghanaian footballer
- Rebecca Akufo-Addo (born 1951), Ghanaian public figure
- Simon Addo (born 1974), Ghanaian footballer
