= Sharp EL-8 =

Electronic calculator

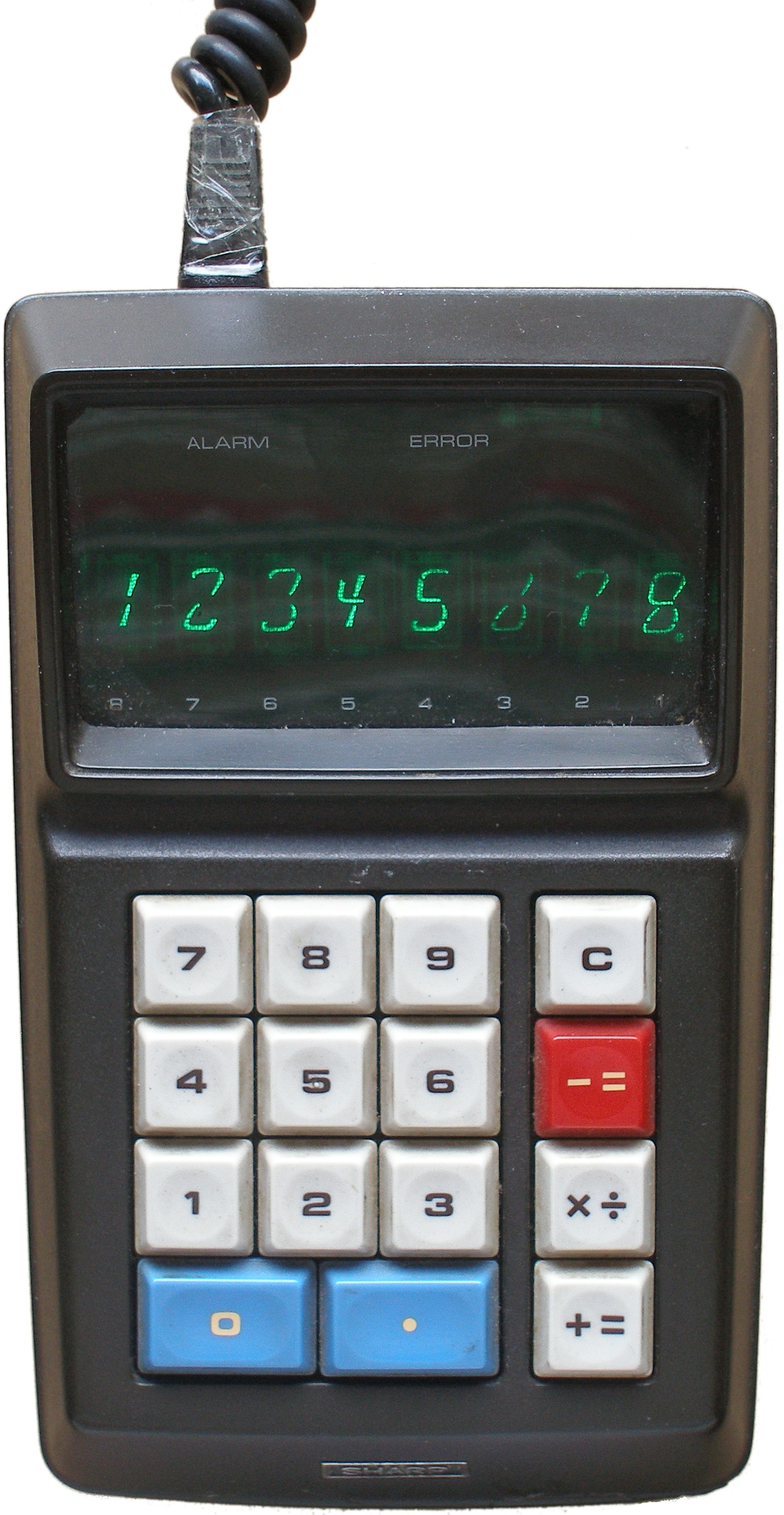
- Sharp EL-8 of 1971
- Manufacturer: Sharp Corporation
- Introduced: 1970 or 1971
- Predecessor: QT-8D, QT-8B
- Cost: JP¥84,800, US$345

Calculator
- Display type: 8-digit vacuum fluorescent display

Other
- Power supply: 6 Ni–Cd AA batteries (450 mAh in total) or AC adapter
- Power consumption: ~1W
- Weight: 0.72 kg
- Dimensions: 164 × 102 × 70 mm

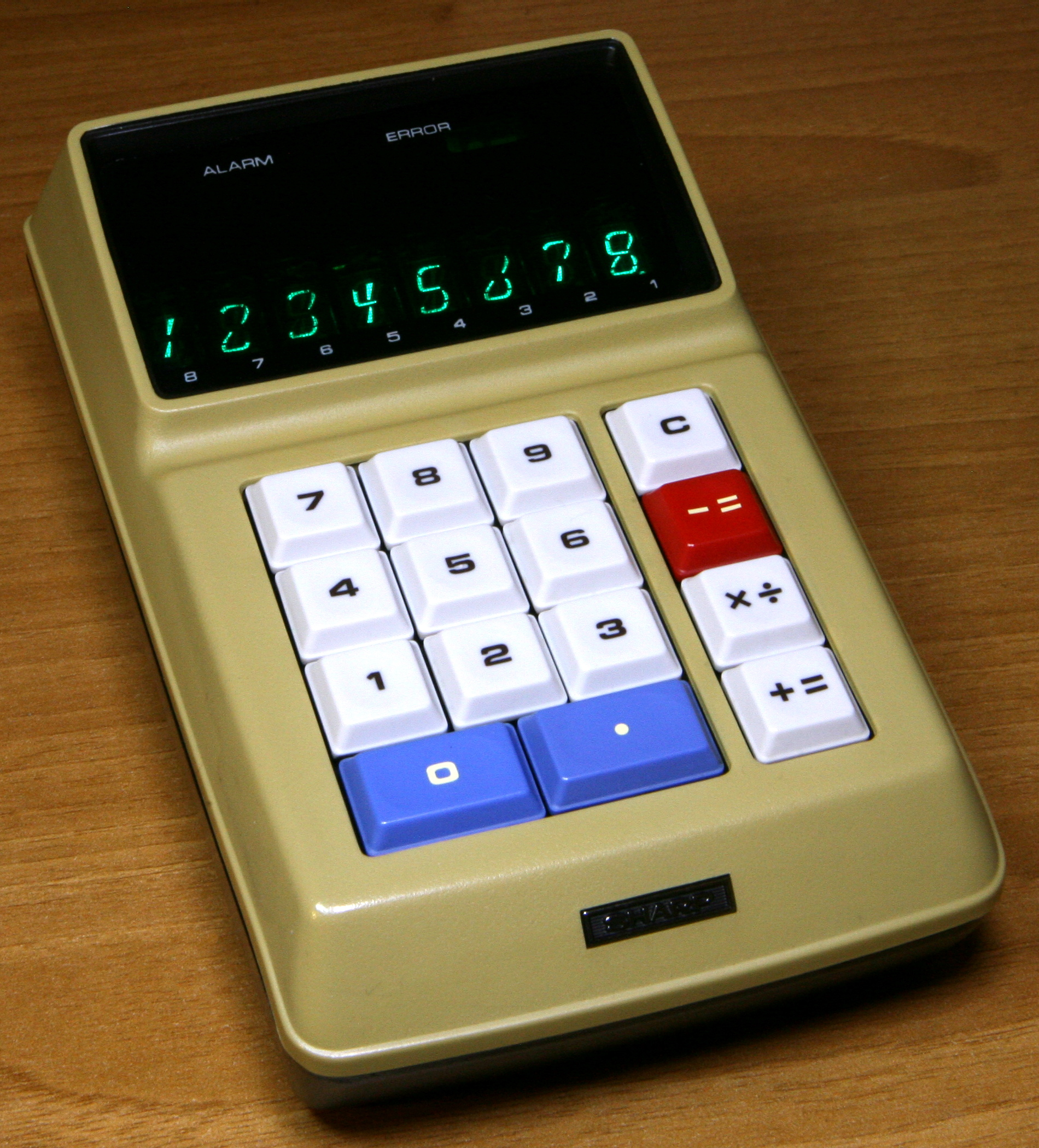
Sharp EL-8 of December 1970

The Sharp EL-8, also known as the ELSI-8, was one of the earliest mass-produced hand-held electronic calculators and the first hand-held calculator to be made by Sharp Corporation. Introduced around the start of 1971, (Note: Some sources claim the EL-8's introduction was in January 1971, others claim it was in November 1970.) it was based on Sharp's preceding QT-8D and QT-8B compact desktop calculators and used the same logic circuits, but it was redesigned to fit in a much smaller case.

Most electronic calculators before the EL-8 were intended for desktop use. Sharp's predecessor to the EL-8, the battery-powered QT-8B, was just a portable version of a compact desk calculator. The EL-8 was much smaller, small enough to be used in one's hand: 164 mm (6.46 in) long, 102 mm (4.02 in) wide, and 70 mm (2.76 in) thick, and weighing 0.72 kg (1.59 lb) with batteries. Although it was still too bulky to easily fit in a pocket, it was an important step toward the development of the pocket calculator.

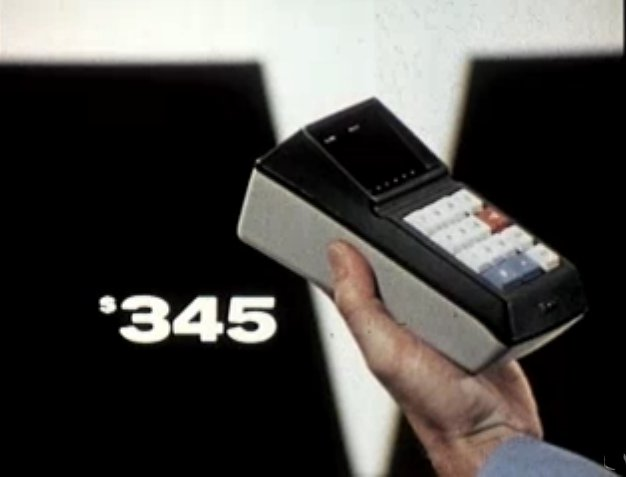
Ad showing the calculator's original price.

The EL-8's original price in Japan was 84,800 Japanese yen. The retail price in 1971 was US$345 (equivalent to US$2,308 in 2021).

== Operation and design ==
The operation and performance of the EL-8 are identical to its predecessor calculators, the QT-8D and QT-8B, because its logic circuits use the same set of four Rockwell-manufactured large-scale integrated circuits. Likewise, its keyboard has the same layout, including the combined ×÷ key, and it also uses magnetic reed switches.

The display, like that of the QT-8D, is an 8-digit vacuum fluorescent display with nine individual tubes: eight digit tubes and a single extra tube for the minus sign and overflow indicator. As with the QT-8D, the tubes are Iseden "itron" tubes (Note: "Iseden" is an abbreviation for the manufacturer's full name, Ise Denshi Kōgyō Kabushiki Kaisha (伊勢電子工業株式会社, "Ise Electronics Industry Stock Company"), known in English as Ise Electronics Corporation.) with the same distinctive "handwritten" digit style and the same half-height "0". However, unlike the QT-8D, the EL-8 digit tubes only have eight segments to form digits, and the EL-8's extra tube is positioned at the top right corner of the display instead of at its right end. A separate lamp serves as a power indicator.

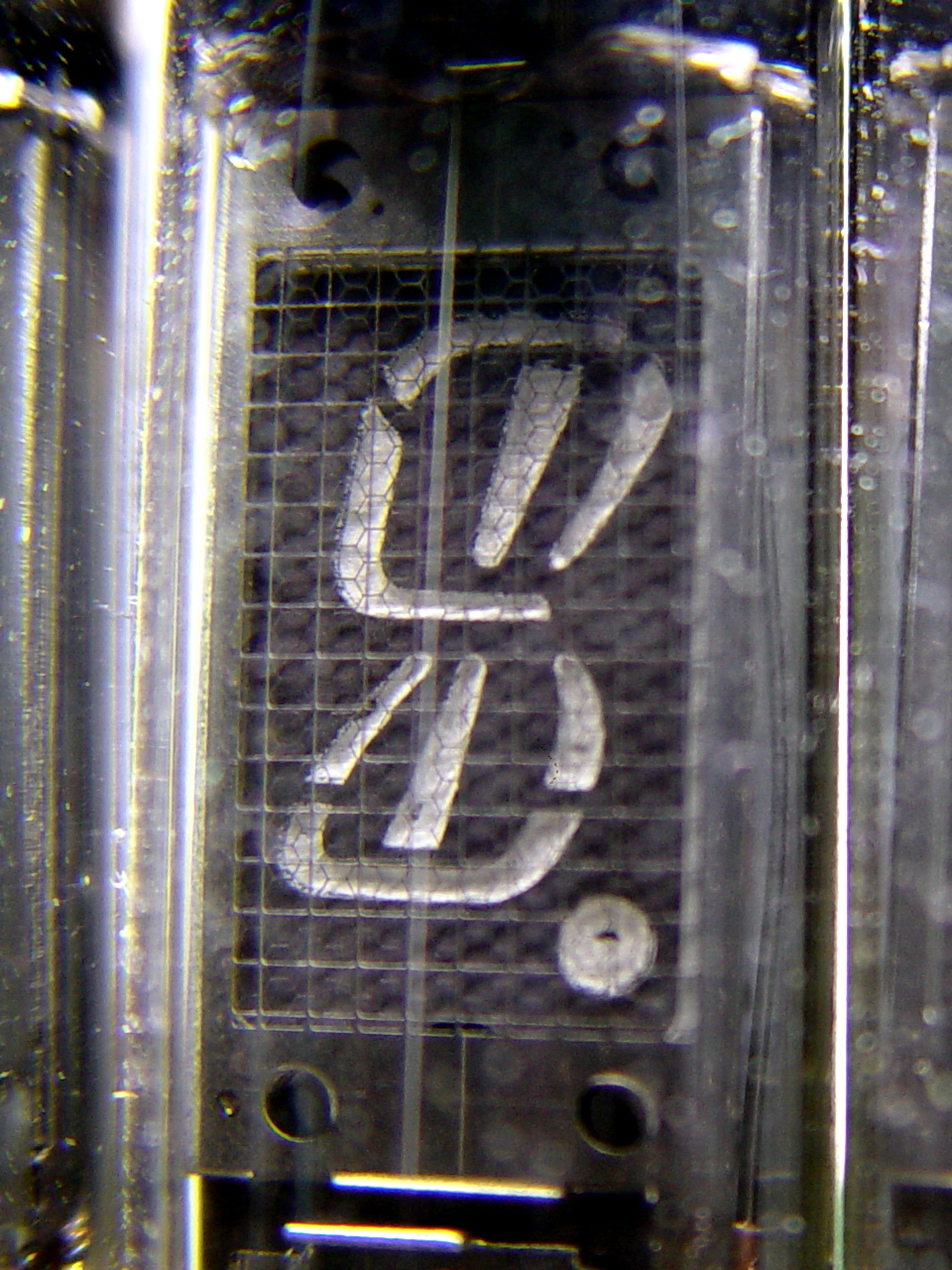
Itron DG10L Vacuum-Fluorescent Display Tube

Power is supplied by an integrated rechargeable battery pack or by an external battery charger, which also serves as an AC adapter to allow the calculator to operate from AC power. The battery pack (model EL-84) contains six nickel-cadmium AA batteries connected in series, giving a total voltage of 7.2 volts and, with the original batteries, a total capacity of 450 mAh. (Present-day nickel-cadmium AA batteries have much greater capacity.) Battery life with the original batteries is about three hours, which gives an average power usage of about one watt. The battery charger (model EL-81) supplies power to the calculator's charging input at voltages of 8.7 and 9.6 volts; the combined input power rating is about 3.2 watts.

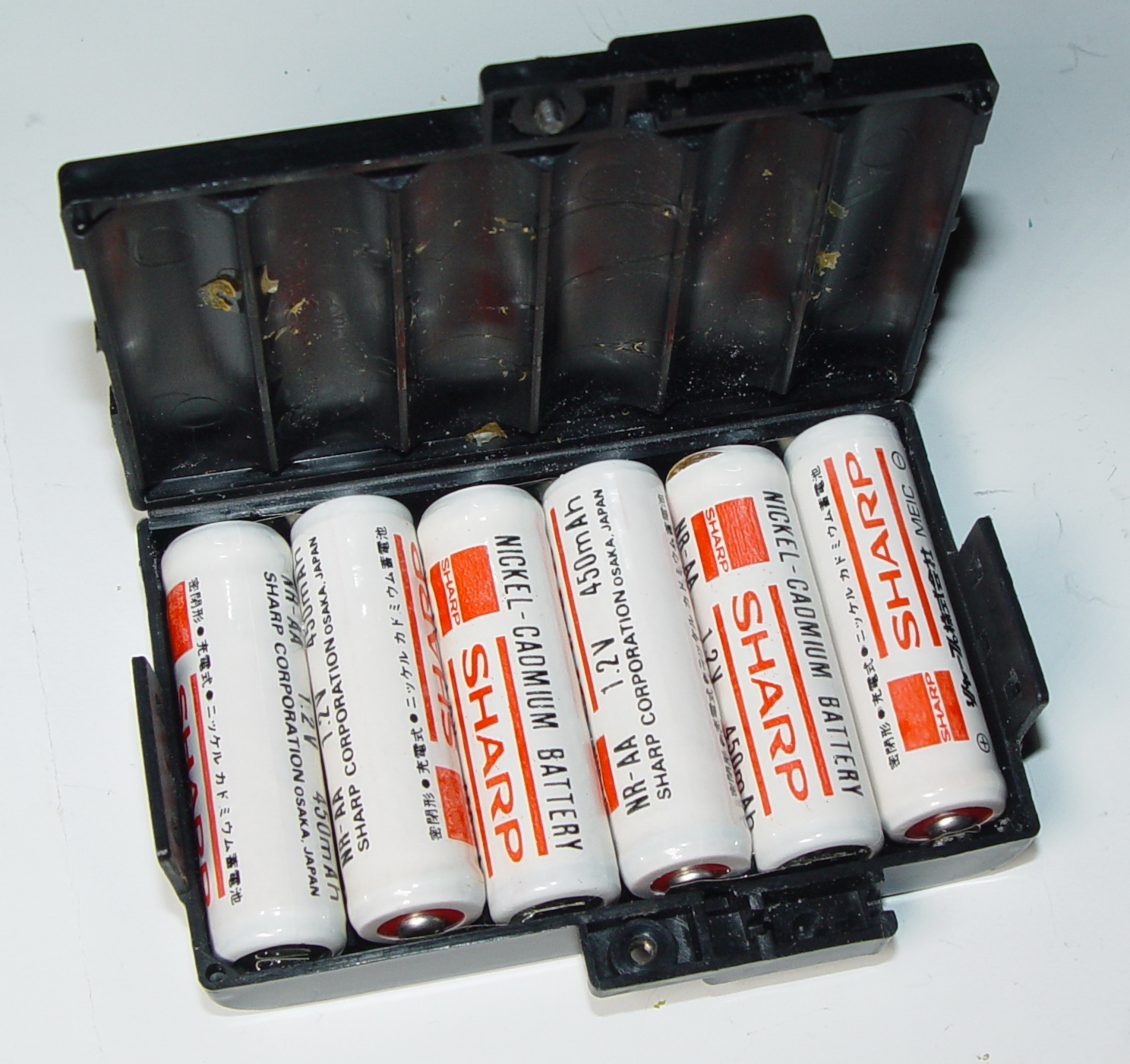
Sharp NR-AA Rechargeable Battery

The EL-8's battery pack is much smaller than that of the QT-8B, and this was critical in reducing the EL-8's size and weight. However, these smaller batteries have much less capacity, and in order to maintain reasonable battery life, power usage had to be drastically cut. This was done by various improvements in the electronics, especially in the display. The QT-8B's display tubes are driven by discrete transistors; to reduce the number of transistors needed, only one tube is lit at a time, and the circuitry cycles through the tubes in rapid sequence. The rapid switching from tube to tube requires load resistors which absorb a lot of power. In the EL-8, the display tubes are driven by integrated circuits containing multiple transistors, and all of the tubes are kept lit constantly. No switching is required and no load resistors are needed, so much less power is used. Furthermore, because each tube in the QT-8B is only lit for a fraction of the time, the tubes need a high momentary brightness in order to get a reasonable average brightness, so they must be driven with a high voltage, requiring a separate high-voltage power supply. Since the EL-8 tubes are kept constantly lit, they don't have to be as bright, so the driving voltage can be lower and a separate high-voltage supply is not needed. In addition to the display improvements, the EL-8 also has a more efficient clock generator circuit for its logic than the QT-8B. Together, these changes reduced the EL-8's power usage to less than a third of that of the QT-8B.

== Related models ==
Sharp also produced a version of the EL-8 without batteries called the EL-8A. This was offered at a lower price, about US$300 (equivalent to US$2,007 in 2021). Since this version lacks batteries, it is somewhat lighter and requires an AC adapter for power. The power connector is also slightly different, having an extra contact.

In addition to its own EL-8 and EL-8A, Sharp also built OEM versions of the EL-8 for the Swedish office machine company Facit and its subsidiary Addo, which sold them as the Facit 1111 and the Addo-X 9364. These have the same internals as the EL-8, but the case and keycaps are different.
