= Sharp QT-8D =

Electronic calculator

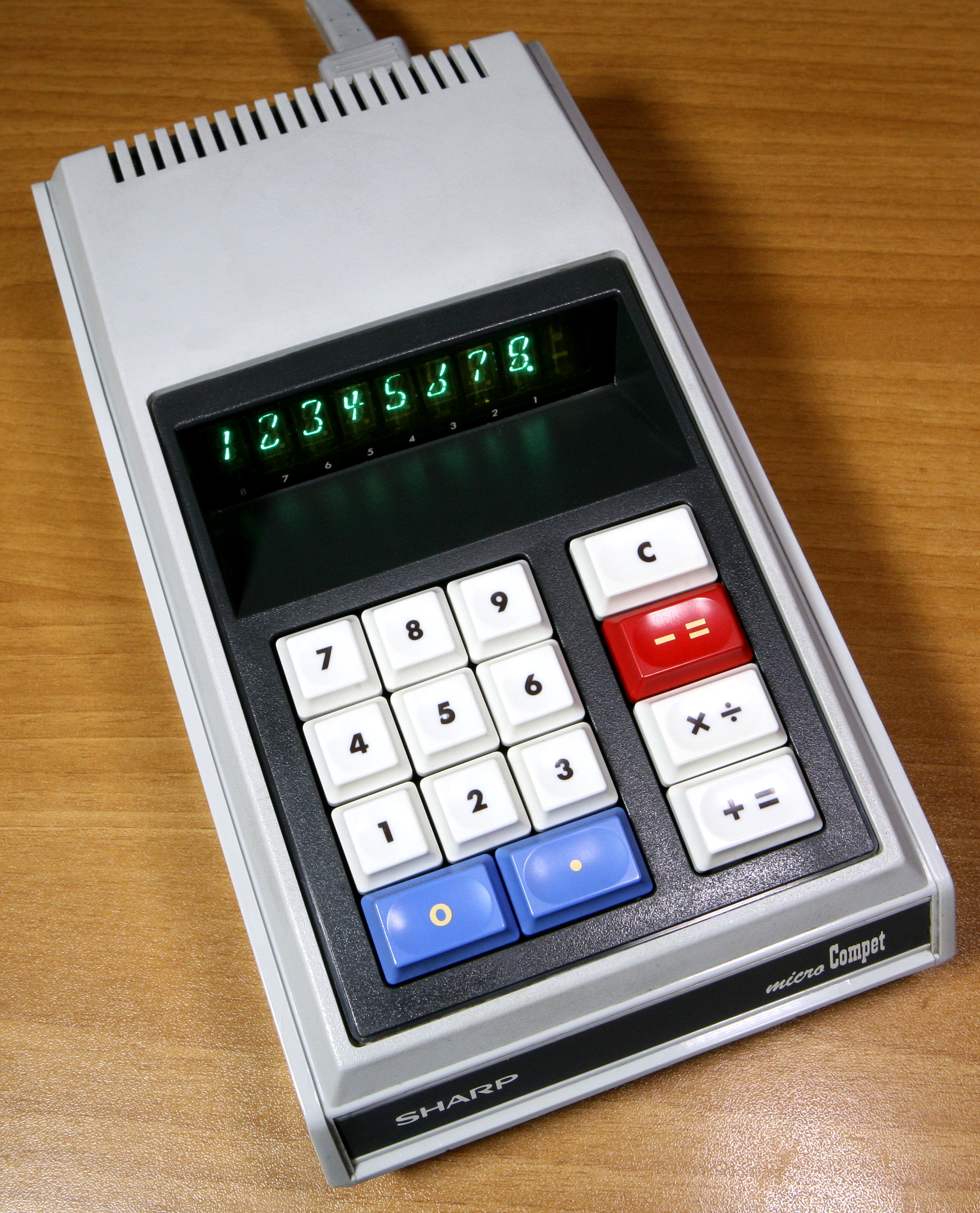
- Sharp QT-8D Micro Compet front view
- Manufacturer: Sharp Corporation
- Introduced: 1969
- Successor: EL-8
- Cost: JP¥99,800, US$395

Calculator
- Display type: 8-digit vacuum fluorescent display

Other
- Power supply: 110 V AC ～ wall power
- Power consumption: 7W
- Weight: 1.4 kg
- Dimensions: 245 × 135 × 70 mm

The Sharp QT-8D Micro Compet is a small electronic desktop calculator marketed by Sharp Corporation. It was the first mass-produced calculator to have its logic circuitry entirely implemented with LSI (large-scale integration) integrated circuits (ICs) based on MOS (metal-oxide-semiconductor) technology. (Note: The Victor 3900, introduced in 1965, was based on 29 MOS ICs which at the time were referred to as large-scale. But this calculator sold very poorly and only a few thousand were produced, mainly due to unexpected reliability problems with the MOS ICs. Also the boundary for what level of integration qualifies as LSI has shifted over time. Sharp itself described the QT-8D's ICs as "Extra Large Scale Integration" (ELSI), since at the time these ICs were at the leading edge, but this term was never generally adopted and further improvements in integration density soon rendered it meaningless.) When it was introduced in late 1969, it was one of the smallest electronic calculators ever produced commercially. Previous electronic calculators had been about the size of a typewriter and had logic circuits built from numerous discrete transistors and diodes or small- to medium-scale ICs. The QT-8D's logic circuits were packed into just four LSI ICs.

The QT-8D was released in Japan at a price of 99,800 Japanese yen, a new low for electronic calculators. The retail price in the United States was $395 in 1970, equivalent to about $2,790 in 2021.

== Operation and design ==
The QT-8D only performs the four basic arithmetic operations of addition, subtraction, multiplication, and division. Like many calculators intended for business use, the QT-8D adds and subtracts in the style of an adding machine: after entering each number, the operator presses either the white += key, to add it to the current total, or the red −= key, to subtract it from the total. However, the QT-8D is unusual in that multiplication and division share a single key ×÷. To multiply or divide, the operator enters the first number, presses ×÷, enters the second number, and then presses either += to multiply or −= to divide. The resulting product or quotient is then added to or subtracted from the total in the usual way, by pressing += or −=.

The keyboard has 15 keys in all and uses magnetic reed switches, which, although expensive, are extremely reliable.

The display has eight digits, with both a minus sign and an overflow indicator dot on the right hand side. The decimal point is "floating"—it is positioned automatically by the calculator logic. This was an advanced feature for the time; many desk calculators of this era had fixed decimal points and required very wide displays to maintain a minimum level of precision across the entire range of numbers available. The QT-8D's floating decimal allowed its display to be much narrower while still keeping eight digits of precision.

The display is a vacuum fluorescent display, the first such display ever used in a production calculator. It is built from nine individual tubes, one tube for each digit and a single extra tube for the minus sign and overflow indicator. These Iseden "itron" tubes (Note: "Iseden" is an abbreviation for the manufacturer's full name, Ise Denshi Kōgyō Kabushiki Kaisha (伊勢電子工業株式会社, "Ise Electronics Industry Stock Company"), known in English as Ise Electronics Corporation.) have a unique digit style which is very different from today's seven-segment displays. Each digit tube uses nine segments to form the digits, (Note: Some sources say eight segments, but this is incorrect for the specific display tubes used in the QT-8D.) and these segments are of varying shapes and lengths, producing a distinctive digit style reminiscent of handwritten digits. The digit "0" is only half the height of the other digits. This half-height zero makes it easy to distinguish zeros from other digits, a useful feature since the QT-8D does not have logic to suppress leading or trailing zeros in the display.

== Development ==
Because Japanese integrated circuit manufacturers were not yet able to produce the high-density MOS LSI ICs which Sharp needed, Sharp sought help from U.S. semiconductor firms. Sharp eventually made an agreement with Rockwell International, which manufactured the QT-8D's LSI ICs for Sharp based on Sharp's logic designs. Each of the four LSI ICs contains the equivalent of about 700 to 900 transistors, and the ICs are named based on their functions. The NRD 2256 handles numerical read-in and display, converting keyboard scancodes into digit values and activating the various display tube segments based on digit values. The DC 2266 does decimal-point control, performing the automatic floating-decimal logic and aligning decimal points for arithmetic operations. The AC 2261 controls the arithmetic and provides the registers, and the AU 2271 performs the arithmetic (using a digital adder) and controls input to the registers. (Note: The names of the chips which handle the arithmetic apparently changed at some point; an article on the QT-8D from an early 1969 issue of the journal Electronics lists them as the AC 2266 and AU 2276 rather than the AC 2261 and AU 2271. The specific breakdown in function between the AC 2261 and the AU 2271 is somewhat unclear, since the Electronics article and the Popular Science article aren't consistent.)

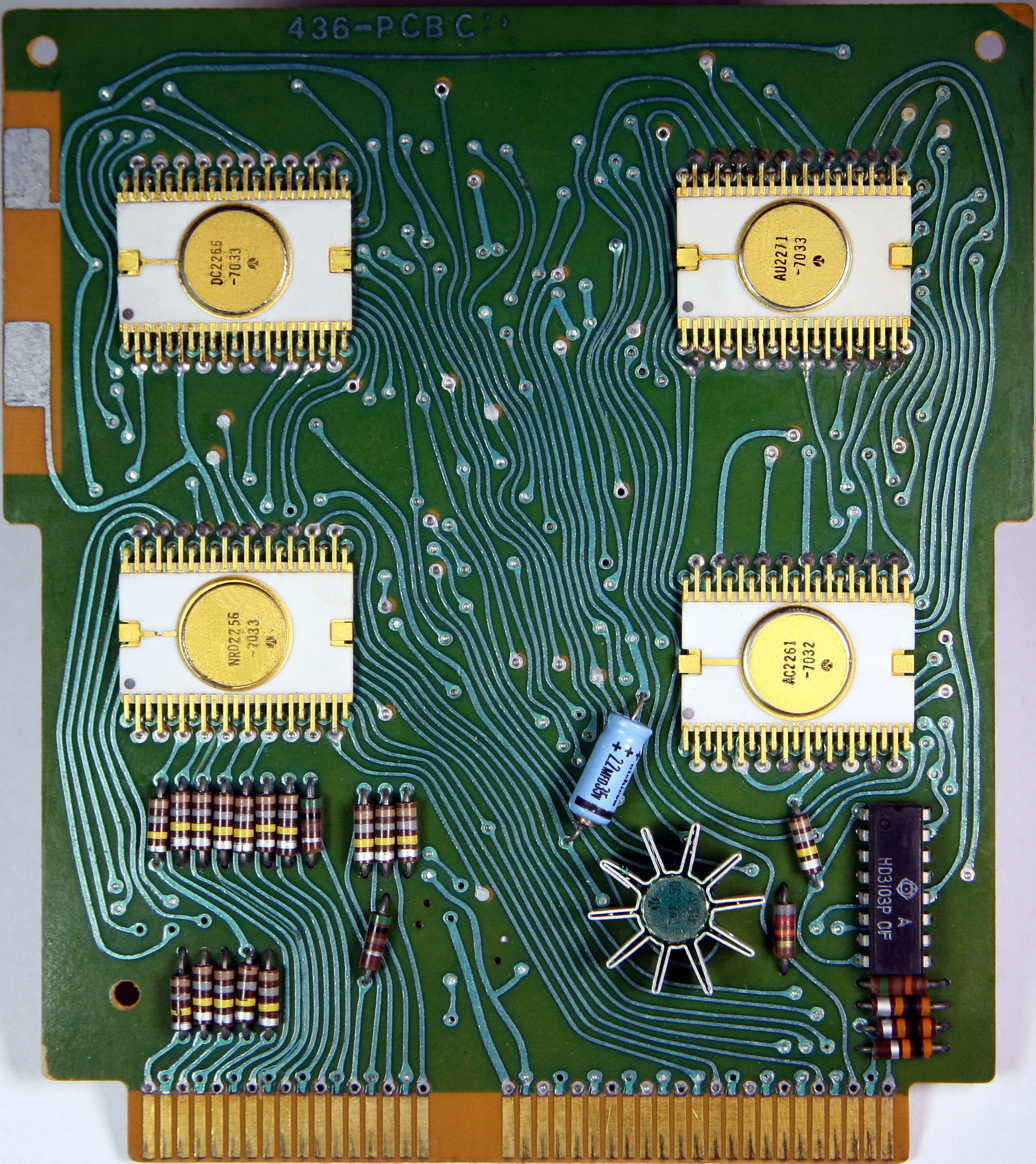
Sharp QT-8D Micro Compet Main PCB

By the standards of its time, the QT-8D is quite a fast calculator. Dividing 99999999 by 1, which is the worst case for the simple long division method used on many calculators, takes roughly 200 milliseconds, and addition and subtraction are nearly instantaneous.

The QT-8D is much smaller than earlier calculators; it is about 245 mm (9.6 in) long, 135 mm (5.3 in) wide, and 70 mm (2.8 in) high, and it weighs about 1.4 kg (3.1 lb). Although it isn't truly portable, since it needs AC power to operate, it does have a carrying handle on the rear, allowing it to be moved around easily. Its MOS LSI technology also greatly reduced its power usage compared to previous calculators: it has an AC power consumption rating of only 7 watts.

This low power usage made it feasible for Sharp to introduce a battery-powered version, the QT-8B, in mid-1970. This was the first mass-produced electronic calculator to be battery-powered. It replaced the QT-8D's integrated power supply with a rechargeable battery pack, but it was otherwise nearly identical to the QT-8D.

The four ICs of the QT-8D and QT-8B were also used as the basis of the Sharp EL-8, one of the first mass-produced hand-held electronic calculators, introduced in 1971.

Sharp also built OEM versions of the QT-8D for the Swedish office machine company Facit and its subsidiary Addo, which sold them as the Facit 1115 and the Addo-X 9354. These had the same internals as the QT-8D but used a different case and keycaps.

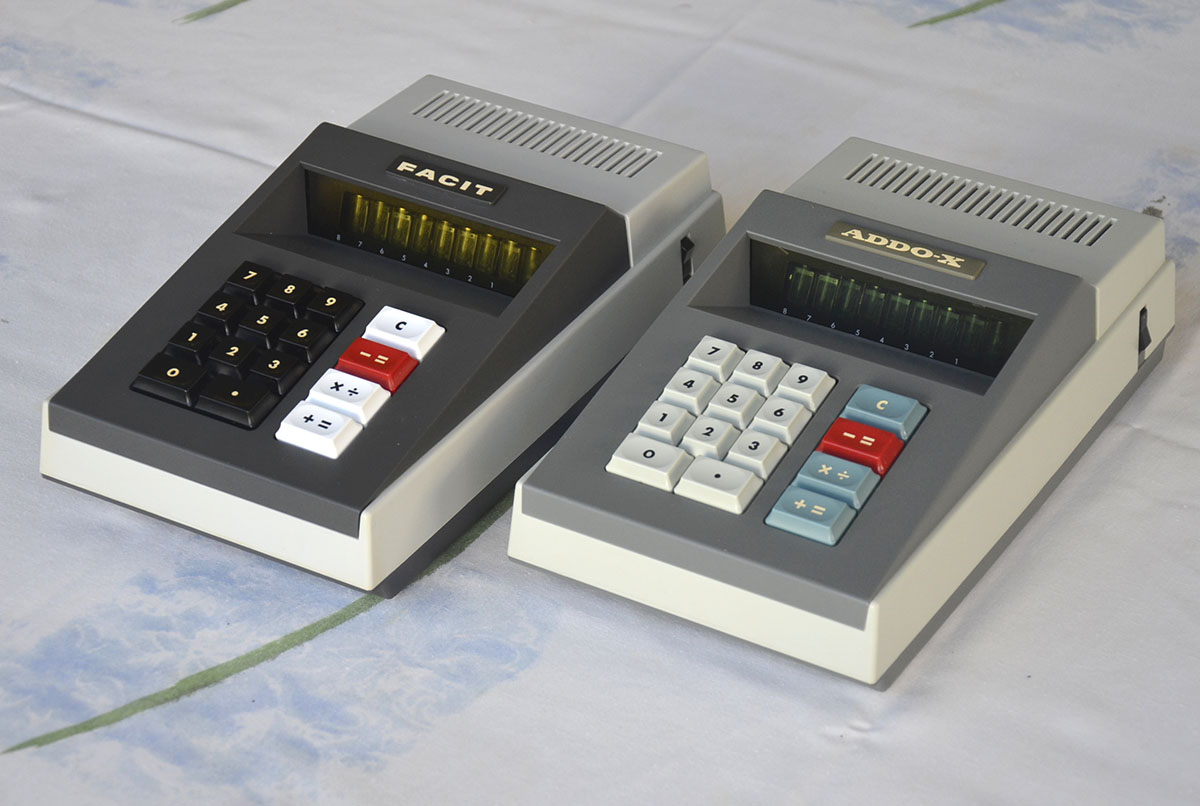
Facit 1115J and Addo-X 9354

The Soviet-built Elektronika EKVM 24-71, introduced in 1971, was reverse-engineered from the Sharp QT-8D with minor differences.
