= Addo =

Addo may refer to:

- Addo (surname)
- Addo Elephant National Park in Eastern Cape province, South Africa
- Addo, Eastern Cape, village in Eastern Cape province, South Africa
- Addo Sign, digital signing solution
- AB Addo, Swedish former manufacturer of office machines
- Edo language, also known as "Addo"
- A nickname given to New Addington

== Given name ==
- Addo Bonetti (1926–2021), American politician
- Addo Kazianka (born 1936), Italian racing cyclist
- Addo Ndala (born 1973), Congolese hurdler
- Kwasi Kwarteng (born 1975), British politician with second name Addo
