= Daniel Addo =

Daniel Addo may refer to:

- Daniel Addo (footballer, born 1976), Ghanaian footballer
- Daniel Addo (footballer, born 1987), Ghanaian footballer
- Daniel Ashley Addo (born 1989), Ghanaian footballer
- Daniel Wilson Addo, Ghanaian banker
- Daniel Addo (soldier), former chief of the defence staff of Ghana's armed forces

== See also ==
- Addo (surname)
