= Barbara Akuorkor Benisa =

Politician

Amb. Barbara Akuorkor Benisa

Ghana High Commissioner to Malta
- President: Nana Akufo-Addo
- Preceded by: Mercy Bampo Addo

Personal details
- Born: Ghana
- Party: New Patriotic Party

Barbara Akuorkor Benisa is a Ghanaian diplomat and the newly appointed High Commissioner of Ghana to Malta.

== Career and appointment ==
Benisa worked with the Royal Dutch Airlines (KLM) before her appointment to serve as a High Commissioner of Ghana to Malta.

== Committee ==
Barbara has served on the President of Ghana, Nana Akuffo Addo's, ‘Beyond the Return Steering Committee’ from 2020 till date.

=== 'Beyond the Return' Steering Committee ===
'Beyond the return' - a decade of African Renaissance (2020 - 2030) is a follow-up project set up by Ghana after the 2019 'Year of return' project. The steering committee is a 20-member committee set up to systemize the 'beyond the return' project. the committee was inaugurated on May 27, 2020. The mission of this project is to consolidate the gains made and grow tourism in the country, showcase its investment potential and solidify its diaspora engagement programmes.
