= Sharp QT-8B =

The Sharp QT-8B Micro Compet, a portable electronic desktop calculator, was the first mass-produced calculator to be battery-powered. Introduced in mid-1970, it was based on its immediate predecessor, the QT-8D introduced in late 1969, but it replaced the QT-8D's integrated power supply with a rechargeable battery pack. It has the same calculating integrated circuits as the QT-8D and is of similar appearance and dimensions; the power supply is the only major difference.

The QT-8B's release price in Japan was 117,000 yen. The U.S. price in mid-1971 was $495, equivalent to about $2,700 in 2010. These prices were somewhat higher than those for the preceding QT-8D.

The QT-8B's battery pack contains six nickel-cadmium C batteries connected in series, giving a total voltage of 7.5 volts and, with the original batteries, a total capacity of 1200 milliampere-hours. (Modern nickel-cadmium C batteries have much greater capacity.)

For recharging, the calculator accepts 12-volt DC external power, with an input power rating of 6.5 watts. Normally the calculator is recharged from AC power by plugging it into an external charging station (model QTA-2) which is a little longer than the calculator and has a plug that fits into the calculator's charging socket. The calculator sits on top of the base of this charging station and can be used while charging; it can also be locked into the station for extra stability. An adapter for using 12-volt DC automobile power was also available.

The display used is vacuum fluorescent display.There is a slight difference between the QT-8D and the QT-8B in the operation of the right-hand display tube, which contains both a minus-sign indicator and a large dot. On the QT-8D, this dot is used as an overflow error indicator. But on the QT-8B, it acts as a low-battery indicator; overflow errors are signalled by displaying all zeroes with all the decimal point indicators lit.

Sharp made an OEM version of the QT-8B for Burroughs, the Burroughs C3146, which has some significant differences from Sharp's own version. The QT-8B needs an external station for recharging its batteries and for AC operation, but the C3146 has its AC power supply built in, along with the batteries and charging electronics, and can thus be plugged directly into AC power. Since the C3146 has both a battery pack and an AC power supply, it also has a larger case to accommodate them. Like the Sharp, the Burroughs machine can also use 12-volt DC automobile power via an adapter. Otherwise, the C3146's electronics are identical to those of the QT-8B.
