= Mercy Bampo Addo =

Ghanaian politician and diplomat

Amb. Mercy Bampo Addo

Ghana High Commissioner to Malta
- Incumbent
- Assumed office July 2017
- President: Nana Akufo-Addo
- Preceded by: Kenneth Enos Kofi Tachie
- Succeeded by: Barbara Akuorkor Benisa

Personal details
- Born: Ghana
- Party: New Patriotic Party

Mercy Bampo Addo is a Ghanaian diplomat and a member of the New Patriotic Party of Ghana. She is currently Ghana's High Commissioner to Malta, having assumed office in July 2017. Between 2003 and 2009 she was the Deputy Minister and speech writer for the President of Ghana.

== Career ==
She taught History and Current Affairs at the secondary school level for three and a half years. She worked as a Public Relations practitioner for over two decades first in Ghana’s Cocoa Industry and later, at the Ghana Institute of Management and Public Administration (GIMPA).

Subsequently, Addo transitioned to public administration communications, taking up position at the Ghana Institute of Management and Public Administration (GIMPA), where she handled public relations and related administrative duties.

== Education ==
Bampo Addo graduated from the University of Ghana, Legon, and holds a master’s degree in governance and leadership, a Graduate Diploma in Journalism and Communication as well as an Honours degree in History.

She later pursued advanced studies attaining a Master of Art in Governance and leadership from the Ghana Institute of Management and Public Administration. After completing her bachelor's degree, Bampo Addo taught History and Current Affairs at the secondary school level for three and a half years, applying her academic training in educational settings.

== Ambassadorial appointment ==
In July 2017, Ghanaian President Nana Akufo-Addo named Mercy Bampo Addo as Ghana's ambassador to Malta. She was among 22 other distinguished Ghanaians who were named to head various diplomatic missions in the world.

== Personal life ==
Mercy Bampo Addo is married to Prof. Samuel Tetteh Addo, a professor of Geography of the University of Ghana. They have five children.

=== Public persona and interests ===
Bampo Addo's work supports vulnerable women and young people in deprived communities by helping them secure credit and work-related equipment to boost their productivity and economic output. Additionally, she engages in counselling for unemployed Ghanaian youth, aiming to foster a mindset shift that opens opportunities in both formal and informal sectors.
