= Emmanuel Akwei Addo =

Ghanaian lawyer

- Born: Emmanuel Nii Akwei Addo; 10 September 1943; Accra
- Died: 7 February 2017 (aged 73); Accra
- Education: Accra Academy; Mfantsipim School; University of Ghana; Emmanuel College, Cambridge
- Occupation: Appeals court judge

Emmanuel Nii Akwei Addo (10 September 1943 – 7 February 2017) was a Ghanaian Appeal court judge. He was nominated a Justice of the Court of Appeal in Ghana in 2002 by President John Kufuor and retired from the court in 2007. Previously, he was Ghana's Solicitor-General at the Office of the Attorney-General from 1998 to 2002.

== Early life and education ==
Emmanuel Akwei Addo was born on 10 September 1943 in Accra. His parents were Emmanuel Addoquaye Addo and Rose Finola Addo (née Aryee).

He had his elementary schooling at Methodist Primary School in Koforidua and Government Boys School in Kumasi between 1949 and 1957. He studied at Accra Academy from 1958 to 1962 and Mfantsipim School from 1962 to 1964. In 1965, he entered University of Ghana and studied law, graduating in 1968. After studies at the Ghana School of Law, he qualified as a lawyer in 1969. Addo studied at Emmanuel College, Cambridge for an M. A. in Public International Law received in 1978.

== Career ==
In 1970, Addo joined the Attorney-General's Office in Accra and was in the same year, posted to the Attorney-General's Office in Ho in the Volta Region of Ghana. In 1973 he was put in charge of the Attorney General's Office in Ho and headed the office for the next seven years. In 1974, Addo was a member of the Ghanaian delegation on the Ghana-Togo Border Demarcation Commission. From 1979 to 1989 he was the Regional Representative of the Attorney General's Office in Tamale in the Northern Region of Ghana.

In 1987, he was appointed a member of the Yendi reconciliation committee by the PNDC government to implement the Supreme Court Judgement on the Yendi Skin Dispute. He was then appointed to serve as director of the International Law Division of the Ministry of Justice.

In 1989, Addo was promoted chief state attorney and seconded to Ghana's Ministry of Foreign Affairs as director of the Legal and Consular Bureau and worked as legal advisor to the ministry from 1989 to 1998. From this position, he served on the sixth legal committee of the U.N. General Assembly. In 1997, he was elected a member of the International Law Commission of the United Nations for its forty-ninth session and remained a member until its fifty-eighth session held in 2006.

In 2002, he was nominated as a judge of Court of Appeal and was sworn in on 18 June 2002. In 2005, he became the United Nations independent expert on the situation of human rights in the Sudan. He served for five years as a judge retiring in 2007. In 2009, Addo was nominated by President John Atta-Mills to serve as Chairman of an inter ministerial review committee to re-examine the agreement concluded between Ghana and Vodafone on Ghana Telecom.

== Personal life ==
Addo was a Christian and a member of the Methodist Church. Addo married Pamela Nyuietor Tay on 5 April in 1975 in Ho. They had three children; David-Tufa Nii Adotey Addo, Stephanie Naa Adoley Addo and Naa Adorkor Addo.
