= Addoquaye Addo =

Ghanaian footballer

Personal information
- Full name: Daniel Addoquaye Addo
- Date of birth: April 23, 1985 (age 41)
- Place of birth: Accra, Ghana
- Height: 1.77 m (5 ft 10 in)
- Position: Striker

Team information
- Current team: Ashanti Gold SC
- Number: 19

Senior career*
Years	Team	Apps	(Gls)
2004–2007	Power F.C.	96	(38)
2008	Red Star Belgrade	0	(0)
2008–2009	Heart of Lions	18	(4)
2009–	Ashanti Gold SC	2	(1)
- * Club domestic league appearances and goals

Daniel Addoquaye Addo (born 23 April 1985 in Accra) is a Ghanaian football midfielder who played for Ashanti Gold SC.

== Career ==
Addo joined in June 2008 from Power F.C. to Heart of Lions and stands in Ghana Premier League All Star team. On 2 January 2008 was speculated with a move from Heart of Lions link to Red Star Belgrade and he moved to Serbia in February and stayed until June 2008. However, he failed to make an appearance in the Serbian SuperLiga with Red Star. In summer 2009 he signed with Ashanti Gold SC, he scored here in his debut his first goal for his new club.

=== Position ===
Addo can play as attacking midfielder or forward.

== International ==
He was on Ghana's player list for the 2008 African Cup of Nations but was cut from the list on the last day of preparations. On 13 November 2007 he was called up for the Black Stars.
