= David Addo =

Ghanaian football player

Personal information
- Date of birth: 9 February 1983 (age 43)
- Place of birth: Ghana
- Height: 1.79 m (5 ft 10 in)
- Position: Defender

Team information
- Current team: Liberty Professionals FC
- Number: 3

Senior career*
Years	Team	Apps	(Gls)
1998–2004	Zaytuna F.C.		
2005–	Liberty Professionals FC		
- * Club domestic league appearances and goals ‡ National team caps and goals as of May 30, 2008

David Addo (born 9 February 1983) is a Ghanaian football player who currently plays for Liberty Professionals FC.

== Career ==
In winter 2005 Addo moved from Zaytuna F.C. to Liberty Professionals FC on a free transfer.
