= Vacuum fluorescent display =

Display used in consumer electronics

VFD tube variations
7 segments	8 segments (Sharp EL-8)	16 segments
7 segments	8 segments (Sharp EL-8)	16 segments

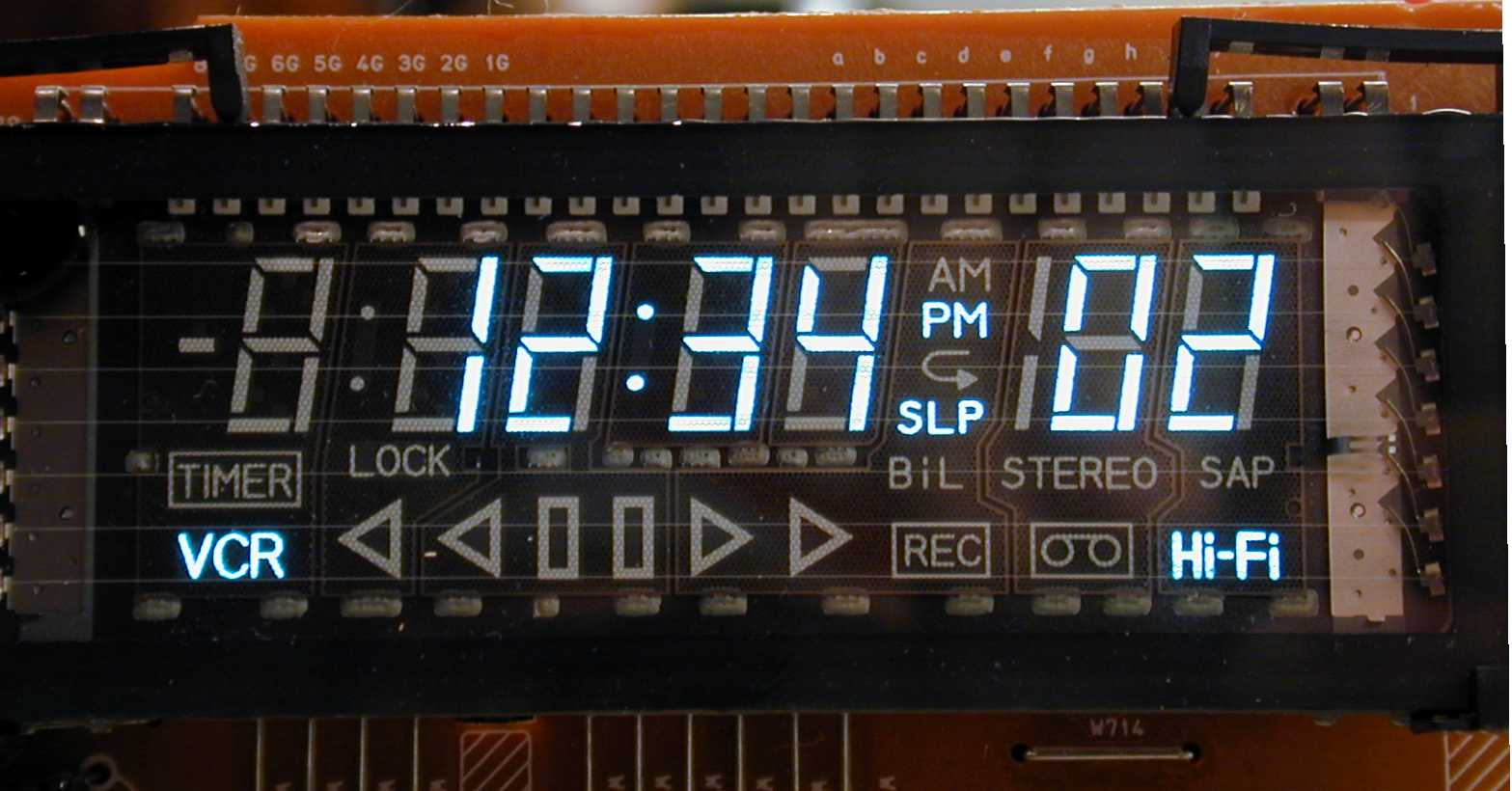
A full view of a typical vacuum fluorescent display used in a videocassette recorder

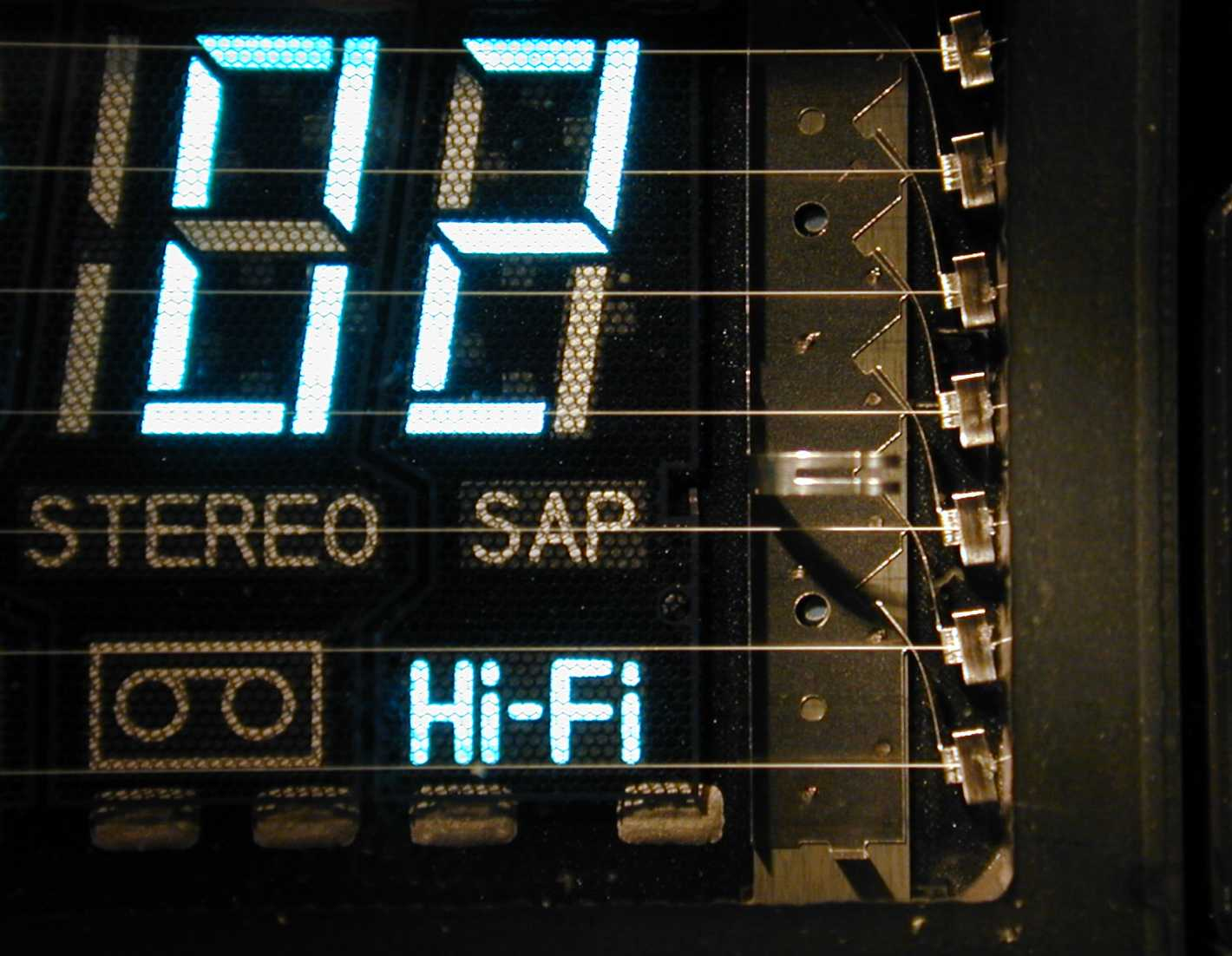
A close-up of the VFD highlighting the multiple filaments, tensioned by the sheet metal springs at the right of the image

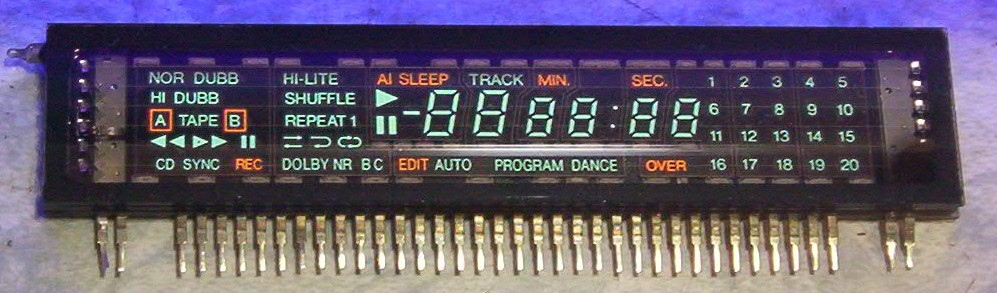
Vacuum fluorescent display from a CD and dual cassette Hi-Fi. All segments are visible due to external ultraviolet illumination.

A vacuum fluorescent display (VFD) is a display device once commonly used on consumer electronics equipment such as video cassette recorders, car radios, and microwave ovens.

A VFD operates on the principle of cathodoluminescence, roughly similar to a cathode-ray tube, but operating at much lower voltages. Each tube in a VFD has a phosphor-coated carbon anode that is bombarded by electrons emitted from the cathode filament. Each tube in a VFD is a triode vacuum tube because it also has a mesh control grid.

Unlike liquid crystal displays (LCDs), a VFD emits very bright light with high contrast and can support display elements of various colors. Standard illumination figures for VFDs are around 640 cd/m^{2} with high-brightness VFDs operating at 4,000 cd/m^{2}, and experimental units as high as 35,000 cd/m^{2} depending on the drive voltage and its timing. The choice of color (which determines the nature of the phosphor) and display brightness significantly affect the lifetime of the tubes, which can range from as low as 1,500 hours for a vivid red VFD to 30,000 hours for the more common green ones. Cadmium was commonly used in the phosphors of VFDs in the past, but the current RoHS-compliant VFDs have eliminated this metal from their construction, using instead phosphors consisting of a matrix of alkaline earth and very small amounts of group III metals, doped with very small amounts of rare earth metals.

VFDs can display seven-segment numerals, multi-segment alpha-numeric characters or can be made in a dot-matrix to display different alphanumeric characters and symbols. In practice, there is little limit to the shape of the image that can be displayed: it depends solely on the shape of phosphor on the anode(s).

The first VFD was the single indication DM160 by Philips in 1959. The first multi-segment VFD was a 1967 Japanese single-digit, seven-segment device made by Ise Electronics Corporation. The displays became common on calculators and other consumer electronics devices. In the late 1980s hundreds of millions of units were made yearly.

== Design ==
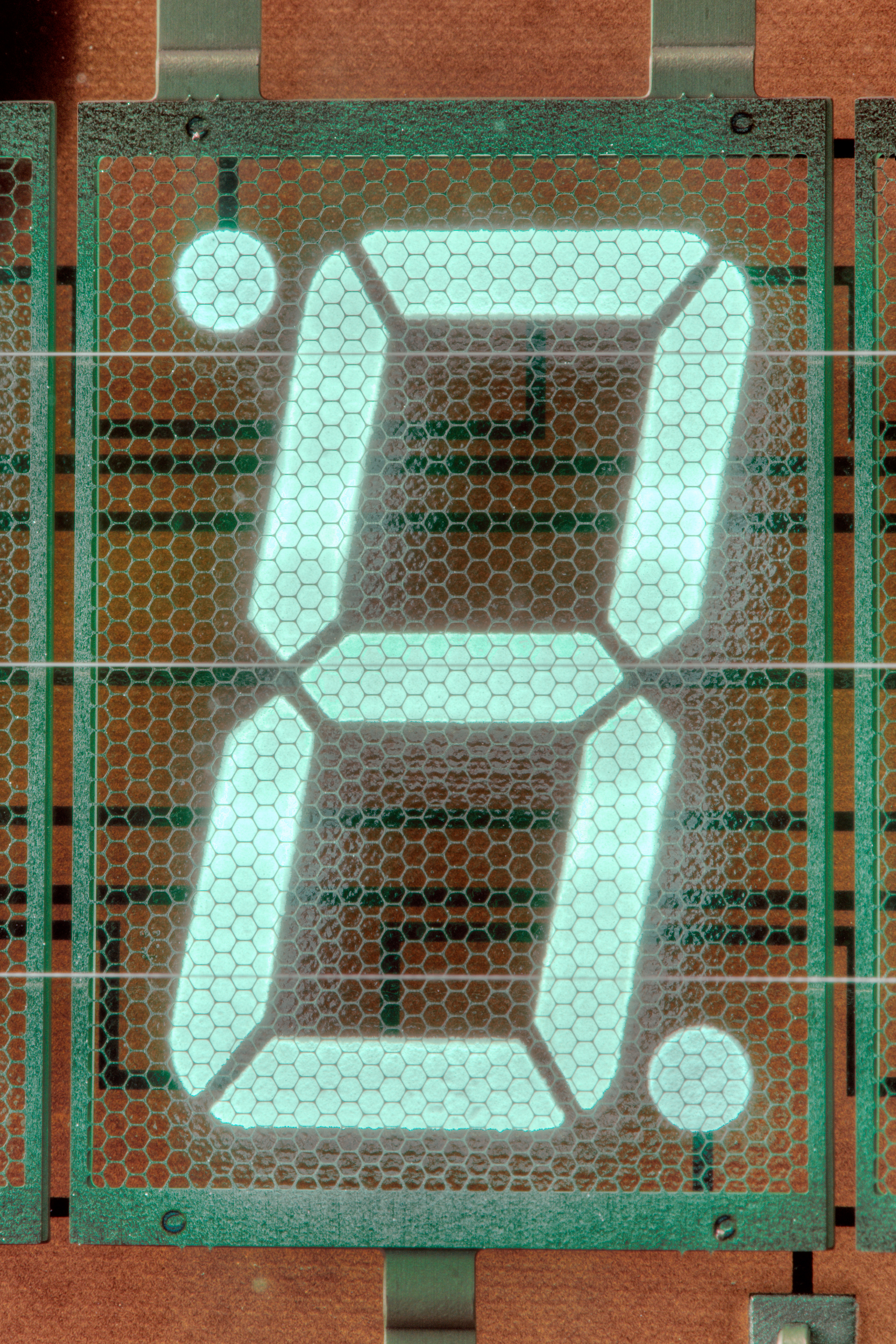
Macro image of a VFD digit with 3 horizontal tungsten wires and control grid

The device consists of a hot cathode (filaments), grids and anodes (phosphor) encased in a glass envelope under a high vacuum condition. The cathode is made up of fine tungsten wires, coated by alkaline earth metal oxides (barium, strontium and calcium oxides), which emit electrons when heated to 650 °C by an electric current. These electrons are controlled and diffused by the grids (made using photochemical machining), which are made up of thin (50 micron thick) stainless steel. If electrons impinge on the phosphor-coated anode plates, they fluoresce, emitting light. Unlike the orange-glowing cathodes of traditional vacuum tubes, VFD cathodes are efficient emitters at much lower temperatures, and are therefore essentially invisible. The anode consists of a glass plate with electrically conductive traces (each trace is connected to a single indicator segment), which is coated with an insulator, which is then partially etched to create holes which are then filled with a conductor like graphite, which in turn is coated with phosphor. This transfers energy from the trace to the segment. The shape of the phosphor will determine the shape of the VFD's segments. The most widely used phosphor is Zinc-doped copper-activated Zinc oxide, which generates light at a peak wavelength of 505 nm.

The cathode wire to which the oxides are applied is made of tungsten or ruthenium-tungsten alloy. The oxides in the cathodes are not stable in air, so they are applied to the cathode as carbonates, the cathodes are assembled into the VFD, and the cathodes are heated by passing a current through them while inside the vacuum of the VFD to convert the carbonates into oxides.

The principle of operation is identical to that of a vacuum tube triode. Electrons can only reach (and "illuminate") a given plate element if both the grid and the plate are at a positive potential with respect to the cathode. This allows the displays to be organized as multiplexed displays where the multiple grids and plates form a matrix, minimizing the number of signal pins required. In the example of the VCR display shown to the right, the grids are arranged so that only one digit is illuminated at a time. All of the similar plates in all of the digits (for example, all of the lower-left plates in all of the digits) are connected in parallel. One by one, the microprocessor driving the display enables a digit by placing a positive voltage on that digit's grid and then placing a positive voltage on the appropriate plates. Electrons flow through that digit's grid and strike those plates that are at a positive potential. The microprocessor cycles through illuminating the digits in this way at a rate high enough to create the illusion of all digits glowing at once via persistence of vision.

The extra indicators (in our example, "VCR", "Hi-Fi", "STEREO", "SAP", etc.) are arranged as if they were segments of an additional digit or two or extra segments of existing digits and are scanned using the same multiplexed strategy as the real digits. Some of these extra indicators may use a phosphor that emits a different color of light, for example, orange.

The light emitted by VFD phosphors often covers a broad part of the visible spectrum and thus can often be filtered to enhance the color saturation providing a deep green or deep blue, or even change the color of the display that is visible to the user, depending on the whims of the product's designers. Phosphors used in VFDs are different from those in cathode-ray displays since they must emit acceptable brightness with only around 50 volts of electron energy, compared to several thousand volts in a CRT. The insulating layer in a VFD is normally black, however it can be removed or made transparent to allow the display to be transparent. AMVFD displays that incorporate a driver IC are available for applications that require high image brightness and an increased number of pixels. Phosphors of different colors can be stacked on top of each other for achieving gradations and various color combinations. Hybrid VFDs include both fixed display segments and a graphic VFD in the same unit. VFDs may have display segments, grids and related circuitry on their front and rear glass panels, using a central cathode for both panels, allowing for increased segment density. The segments can also be placed exclusively on the front instead of on the back, improving viewing angles and brightness.

== Use ==
Besides brightness, VFDs have the advantages of being rugged, inexpensive, and easily configured to display a wide variety of customized messages. Unlike LCDs, VFDs are not limited by the response time of rearranging liquid crystals, and are thus able to function normally in cold, even sub-zero, temperatures, making them ideal for outdoor devices in cold climates. Early on, the main disadvantage of such displays was their use of significantly more power (0.2 watts) than a simple LCD. This was considered a significant drawback for battery-operated equipment like calculators, so VFDs ended up being used mainly in equipment powered by an AC supply or heavy-duty rechargeable batteries.

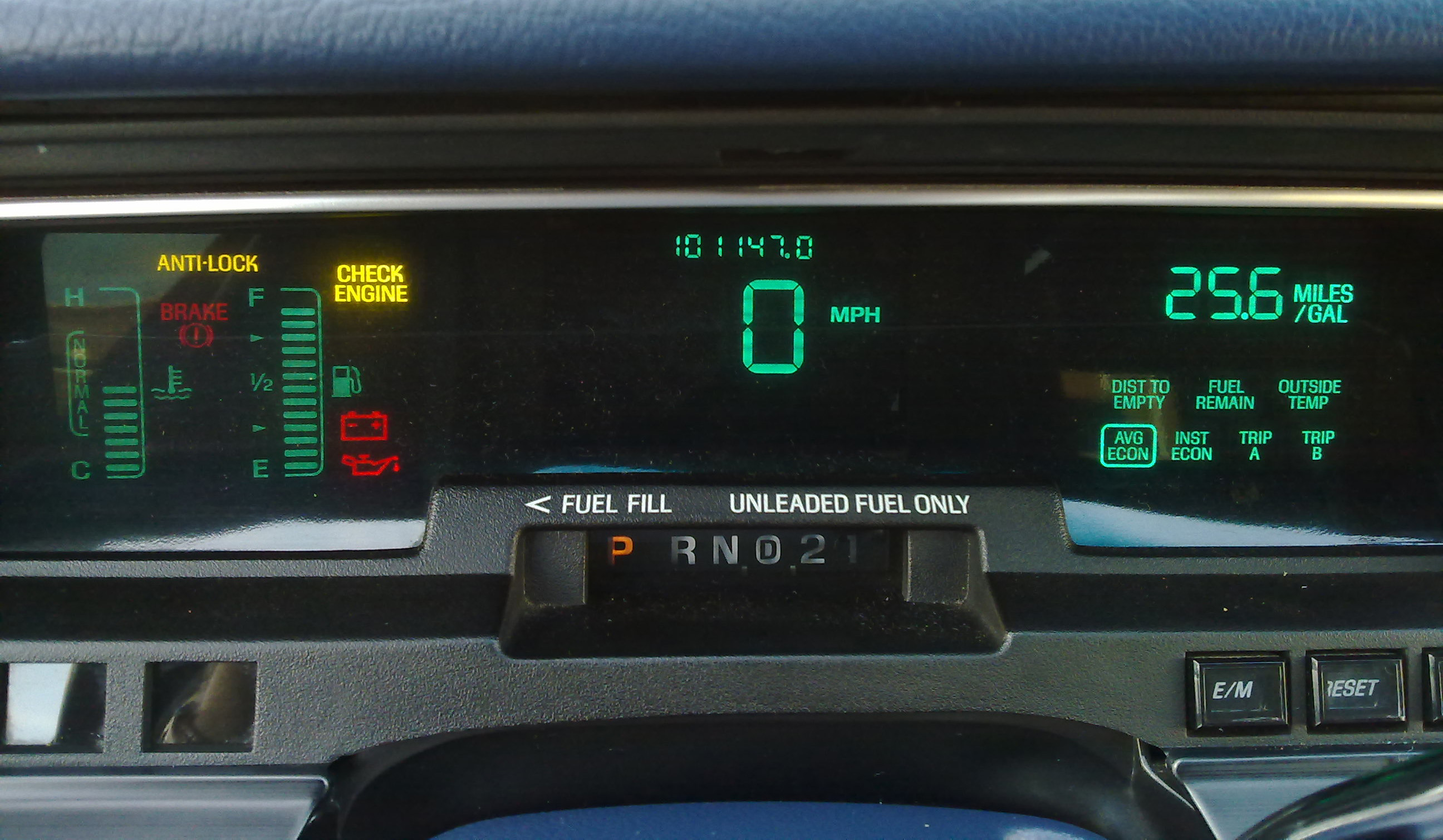
A digital dashboard cluster in a 1992 Mercury Grand Marquis

During the 1980s, this display began to be used in automobiles, especially where car makers were experimenting with digital displays for vehicle instruments such as speedometers and odometers. A good example of these were the high-end Subaru cars made in the early 1980s (referred to by Subaru enthusiasts as a digi-dash, or digital dashboard). The brightness of VFDs makes them well suited for use in cars. The Renault Espace Mk4 and Scenic Mk2 used VFD panels to show all functions on the dashboard including the radio and multi message panel. They are bright enough to read in full sunlight as well as dimmable for use at night. This panel uses four colors; the usual blue/green as well as deep blue, red and yellow/orange.

This technology was also used from 1979 to the mid-1980s in portable electronic game units. These games featured bright, clear displays but the size of the largest vacuum tubes that could be manufactured inexpensively kept the size of the displays quite small, often requiring the use of magnifying Fresnel lenses. While later games had sophisticated multi-color displays, early games achieved color effects using transparent filters to change the color of the (usually light blue) light emitted by the phosphors. High power consumption and high manufacturing cost contributed to the demise of the VFD as a videogame display. LCD games could be manufactured for a fraction of the price, did not require frequent changes of batteries (or AC adapters) and were much more portable. Since the late 1990s, backlit color active-matrix LCD displays have been able to cheaply reproduce arbitrary images in any color, a marked advantage over fixed-color, fixed-character VFDs. This is one of the main reasons for the decline in popularity of VFDs, although they continue to be made. Many low-cost DVD players still feature VFDs.

From the mid-1980s onwards, VFDs were used for applications requiring smaller displays with high brightness specifications, though now the adoption of high-brightness organic light-emitting diodes (OLEDs) is pushing VFDs out of these markets.

Vacuum fluorescent displays were once commonly used as floor indicators for elevators by Otis Elevator Company worldwide and Montgomery Elevator Company in North America (the former from the early 1980s to the late-2000s in the form of (usually two) green 16-segment displays, and the latter from the mid 1980s to the early 2000s in the form of (usually 3) green or blue 10x14 dot-matrix displays, one for the arrow and the other two for the digits).

In addition to the widely used fixed character VFD, a graphic type made of an array of individually addressable pixels is also available. These more sophisticated displays offer the flexibility of displaying arbitrary images, and may still be a useful choice for some types of consumer equipment.

=== Use as amplifier ===
Several radio amateurs have experimented with the possibilities of using VFDs as triode amplifiers. In 2015, Korg released the Nutube, an analogue audio amplifier component based on VFD technology. The Nutube is used in applications such as guitar amplifiers from Vox and the Apex Sangaku headphone amplifier. The Nutube is sold by Korg but made by Noritake Itron.

== Fade ==
Fading is sometimes a problem with VFDs. Light output drops over time due to falling emission and reduction of phosphor efficiency. How quickly and how far this falls depends on the construction and operation of the VFD. In some equipment, loss of VFD output can render the equipment inoperable. Fading can be slowed by using a display driver chip to lower the voltages necessary to drive a VFD. Fading can also occur due to evaporation and contamination of the cathode. Phosphors that contain sulfur are more susceptible to fading.

== History ==
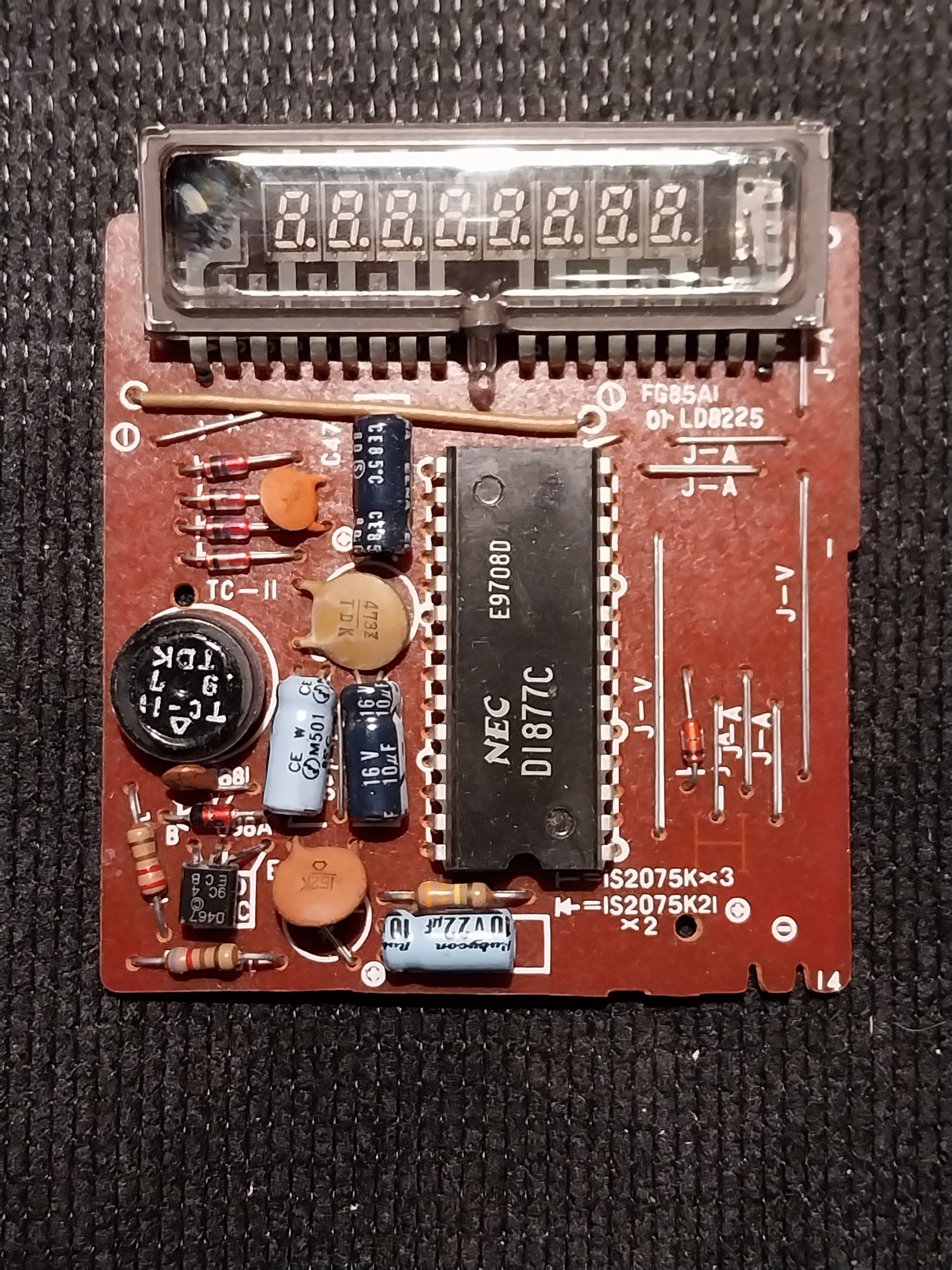
A PCB with VFD display from a Casio M-1 Calculator, produced between 1976 and 1986

Of the three prevalent display technologies – VFD, LCD, and LED – the VFD was the first to be developed. VFD and LED displays were used in early handheld calculators. LED displays were an alternative to VFDs in this use as they had simpler power requirements, not requiring the high voltages. Choice of display technology varied through commercial decisions by the manufacturer, with companies such as Casio, Canon & Sharp dropping LED displays in preference to VFDs and early LCDs, whereas Texas Instruments and Hewlett Packard, both manufacturers of LED displays, continued with LED technology for much longer. Later, once LCD technology was well established, it displaced LED displays and VFDs in handheld calculators, offering lower power requirements at lower cost. More recently, outside the education sector, calculator applications on mobile phones have for many replaced the pocket calculator, and there is progression from LED backlit LCDs back to full LED displays in the form of Organic Light Emitting Diode (OLED) displays.

The first VFD was the single indication DM160 by Philips in 1959. It could easily be driven by transistors, so was aimed at computer applications as it was easier to drive than a neon and had longer life than a light bulb. The 1967 Japanese single digit seven segment display in terms of anode was more like the Philips DM70 / DM71 Magic Eye as the DM160 has a spiral wire anode. The Japanese seven segment VFD meant that no patent royalties needed to be paid on desk calculator displays as would have been the case using Nixie tubes or Panaplex neon digits or for LED displays on pocket calculators. In the UK the Philips designs were made and marketed by Mullard (almost wholly owned by Philips even before WWII).

The Soviet IV-15 VFD tube is very similar to the DM160. The DM160, DM70/DM71 and Soviet IV-15 can (like a VFD panel) be used as triodes. The DM160 is thus the smallest VFD and smallest triode valve. The IV-15 is slightly different shape (see photo of DM160 and IV-15 for comparison).

== See also ==
- Nutube
- LED display
- Sixteen-segment display
