= AB Addo =

Swedish engineering company

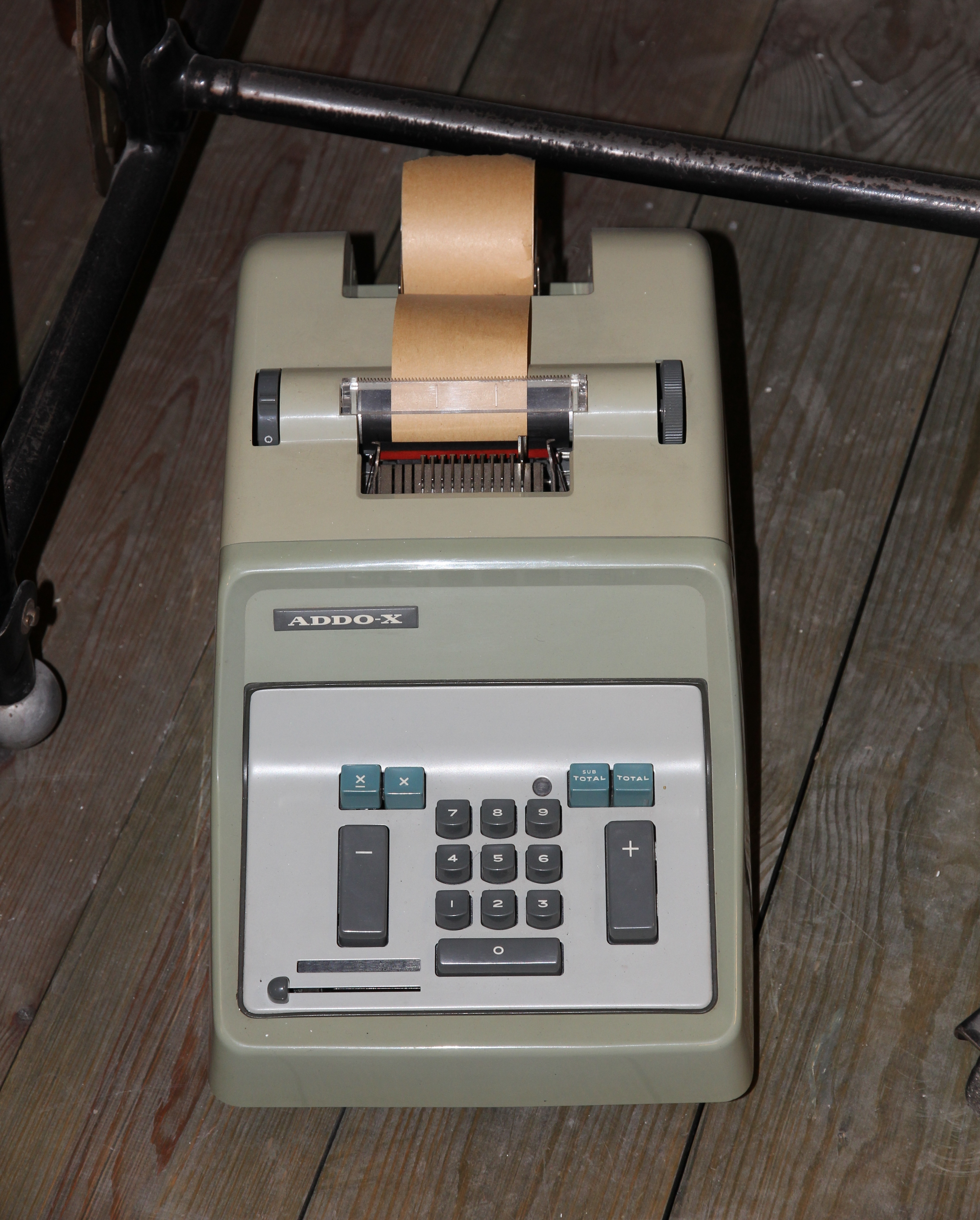
Addo-X Adding Machine

AB Addo (Aktiebolaget Addo) was a Swedish engineering company which manufactured office machines. The company, based in Malmö, was founded in 1918. In 1966, it was incorporated into Facit, where it remained as a subsidiary until the early 1980s. Its products consisted mainly of adding machines, calculators, accounting machines, and data processing equipment.
