= List of participants in the Evolving Genes and Proteins symposium =

This is a list of scientists who participated in the 1964 Evolving Genes and Proteins symposium, a landmark event in the history of molecular evolution. The symposium, supported by the National Science Foundation, took place on September 17 and September 18, 1964 at the Institute of Microbiology of Rutgers University. A summary of the proceedings was published in Science, and the full proceedings were edited by Vernon Bryson and Henry J. Vogel and published in 1965.

Name	Institution	Contributions to proceedings
Philip H. Abelson	Carnegie Institution of Washington	Part V, Evolution of Proteins III: Chairman
Samuel Ajl	Albert Einstein Medical Center	(none)
Alberta M. Albrecht	Sloan-Kettering Institute for Cancer Research	(none)
R. E. Alston	University of Texas at Austin	(none)
Thomas F. Anderson	Institute for Cancer Research	(none)
Christian B. Anfinsen	National Institutes of Health	Part III, Evolution of Proteins I: Chairman
Peter M. Arnow	Squibb Institute for Medical Research	(none)
Robert Austrian	University of Pennsylvania School of Medicine	(none)
Charlotte J. Avers	Douglass College (Rutgers University)	(none)
Donald F. Bacon	Rutgers University	(none)
Raymond C. Bard	University of Kentucky Medical Center	(none)
S. S. Barkulis	Ciba Pharmaceutical Products	(none)
Raymond W. Barratt	Dartmouth College	(none)
Robert H. Bassin	Rutgers University	(none)
Simon Baumberg	Rutgers University	(none)
Ekkehard Bautz	Rutgers University	Part VII, Evolution of Genes I: "Evolutionary Aspects of the Distribution of Nucleotides in DNA and in RNA"
Friedlinde A. Bautz	Rutgers University	(none)
Benjamin Becker	Rutgers University	(none)
Aaron Bendich	Cornell University, Sloan-Kettering Institute	(none)
John Bennett	University of Pennsylvania	(none)
Konrad Bloch	Harvard University	Part II, Evolution of Pathways II: "Lipid Patterns in the Evolution of Organisms"
Harold F. Blum	Princeton University	(none)
Werner Bode	Kansas State University	(none)
F. J. Bollum	Oak Ridge National Laboratory	(none)
Ellis T. Bolton	Carnegie Institution of Washington	Part IX, Evolution of Genes III: "The Evolution of Polynucleotides"
Ellen Borenfreund	Cornell University, Sloan-Kettering Institute	(none)
Alan A. Boyden	Rutgers University	(none)
Werner Braun	Rutgers University	Part VIII, Evolution of Genes II: Chairman
G. Braunitzer	Max Planck Institute of Biochemistry	Part III, Evolution of Proteins I: "Constancy and Variability of Protein Structure in Respiratory and Viral Proteins"
Bernard Briody	New Jersey College of Medicine and Dentistry	(none)
Roy J. Britten	Carnegie Institution of Washington	(none)
William E. Brown	E. R. Squibb and Sons	(none)
Carl W. Bruch	National Aeronautics and Space Administration	(none)
Vernon Bryson	Rutgers University	Editor
John Buettner-Janusch	Yale University	Part III, Evolution of Proteins I: "Evolution of Hemoglobin in Primates"
Vina Buettner-Janusch	Yale University	(none)
J. Paul Burnett	Lilly Research Laboratories	(none)
Melvin Calvin	University of California, Berkeley	Part IX, Evolution of Genes III: "Molecular Regulation and Its Possible Evolutionary Significance"
Guy R. Carta	Rutgers University	(none)
William Charney	Schering Corporation	(none)
F. Chytil	Czechoslovak Academy of Sciences	(none)
Vincent P. Cirillo	State University of New York	(none)
John Clegg	Johns Hopkins University School of Medicine	(none)
Edward P. Cohen	Rutgers University	(none)
Seymour S. Cohen	University of Pennsylvania School of Medicine	(none)
James C. Copeland	Rutgers University	(none)
Maria E. Cora-Figueroa	Rutgers University	(none)
Eileen Corey	Rutgers University	(none)
Arthur Cronquist	New York Botanical Garden	(none)
Patricia Danielson	Rutgers University	(none)
Prasanta Datta	Washington University in St. Louis	(none)
Frank F. Davis	Rutgers University	(none)
Rowland H. Davis	University of Michigan	(none)
A. Gib DeBusk	Florida State University	(none)
M. DeLuca	Johns Hopkins University	Part V, Evolution of Proteins III: "Enzyme Catalysis and Color of Light in Bioluminescent Reactions"
Arnold L. Demain	Merck, Sharp and Dohme	(none)
M. Demerec	Brookhaven National Laboratory	Part IX, Evolution of Genes III: "Homology and Divergence in Genetic Material of Salmonella typhimurium"
J. A. DeMoss	University of California, San Diego	Part V, Evolution of Proteins III: "The Evolution of an Enzyme"
Theodor Dishon	Hebrew University, Hadassah Medical School	(none)
Richard Donovick	Squibb Institute for Medical Research	(none)
Paul Doty	Harvard University	Part VII, Evolution of Genes I: Chairman
C. O. Doudney	Texas Medical Center	(none)
H. W. Dougherty	Duke University Medical Center	Part IV, Evolution of Proteins II: "Comparative Aspects of the Structure and Function of Phosphoglucomutase"
David Durant	University of Miami	(none)
James D. Dutcher	Squibb Institute for Medical Research	(none)
Harry Eagle	Albert Einstein College of Medicine	(none)
Lillian Ellis	Douglass College (Rutgers University)	(none)
Micheline Federman	Douglass College (Rutgers University)	(none)
Michael Filosa	Rutgers University	(none)
William Firshein	Wesleyan University	(none)
Martin Flavin	National Institutes of Health	(none)
A. Fowler	Albert Einstein College of Medicine	(none)
Sidney W. Fox	University of Miami	Part V, Evolution of Proteins III: "Experiments Suggesting Evolution to Protein"
Ernst Freese	National Institutes of Health	Part V, Evolution of Proteins III: "The Role of Mutations in Evolution"
Jaques Fresco	Princeton University	(none)
George Fukui	Wallace Laboratories	(none)
Ethel A. Garcia	Rutgers University	(none)
M. Georgiadas	Rutgers University	(none)
Nancy Gerber	Rutgers University	(none)
Howard Gest	Washington University in St. Louis	(none)
Norman H. Giles	Yale University	(none)
Hazel B. Gillespie	Douglass College (Rutgers University)	(none)
Robert E. Gillis	New Jersey College of Medicine and Dentistry	(none)
Charles Gilvarg	Princeton University	(none)
C. D. Goldthwaite	Albert Einstein College of Medicine	Part VII, Evolution of Genes I: "Nature of Bacteriophages Induced in Bacillus subtilis"
S. Granick	Rockefeller Institute	Part II, Evolution of Pathways II: "Evolution of Heme and Chlorophyll"
Sarah F. Grappel	Rutgers University	(none)
James W. Green	Rutgers University	(none)
Irwin C. Gunsalus	University of Illinois at Urbana-Champaign	(none)
Helene N. Guttman	New York University	(none)
K. Hanabusa	Duke University Medical Center	Part IV, Evolution of Proteins II: "Comparative Aspects of the Structure and Function of Phosphoglucomutase"
Philip Handler	Duke University School of Medicine	Part IV, Evolution of Proteins II: "Comparative Aspects of the Structure and Function of Phosphoglucomutase"
P. Edgar Hare	Carnegie Institution of Washington	(none)
Henry Harris	University of Oxford	Part VIII, Evolution of Genes II: "The Short-Lived RNA in the Cell Nucleus and its Possible Role in Evolution"
Hyman Hartman	University of California, San Diego	(none)
Philip E. Hartman	Johns Hopkins University	(none)
T. Hashimoto	Duke University Medical Center	Part IV, Evolution of Proteins II: "Comparative Aspects of the Structure and Function of Phosphoglucomutase"
Maureen A. Hechtel	Rutgers University	(none)
Michael Heidelberger	New York University Medical School	(none)
Donald R. Helinski	Princeton University	(none)
David Hendlin	Merch, Sharp and Dohme	(none)
David Henley	Princeton University	(none)
Dorothy Henneman	Squibb Institute for Medical Research	(none)
Robert L. Hill	Duke University School of Medicine	Part III, Evolution of Proteins I: "Evolution of Hemoglobin in Primates"
Norman H. Horowitz	California Institute of Technology	Part I, Evolution of Pathways I: "The Evolution of Biochemical Syntheses—Retrospect and Prospect"
Rollin D. Hotchkiss	Rockefeller Institute	Part IX, Evolution of Genes III: Chairman
Riley D. Housewright	U.S. Army Biological Laboratories	(none)
Bill H. Hoyer	National Institutes of Health	Part IX, Evolution of Genes III: "The Evolution of Polynucleotides"
Dorris J. Hutchison	Sloan-Kettering Institute for Cancer Research	(none)
John Inman	Johns Hopkins School of Medicine	(none)
Robert K. Jennings	Office of Naval Research	(none)
James A. Johnston	Rutgers University	(none)
Evan E. Jones	Rutgers University	(none)
J. G. Joshi	Duke University Medical Center	Part IV, Evolution of Proteins II: "Comparative Aspects of the Structure and Function of Phosphoglucomutase"
Thomas H. Jukes	University of California, Berkeley	(none)
Elvin Kabat	Columbia University	(none)
George Kalf	New Jersey College of Medicine and Dentistry	(none)
Nathan O. Kaplan	Brandeis University	Part IV, Evolution of Proteins II: "Evolution of Dehydrogenases"
Walter Kauzmann	Princeton University	(none)
R. W. I. Kessel	Rutgers University	(none)
Klaus Kieslich	Schering AG	(none)
G. Barrie Kitto	Brandeis University	(none)
Deana T. Klein	Albert Einstein College of Medicine	(none)
Bernard W. Koft	Rutgers University	(none)
Arthur Kornberg	Stanford University	Part VII, Evolution of Genes I: "Synthesis of DNA-Like Polymers de novo or by Reiterative Replication"
Kenneth Kraemer	Rutgers University	(none)
Lester O. Krampitz	Western Reserve University	(none)
Aleksandra Kuchayeva	Institute of Microbiology of the Academy of Sciences of the U. S. S. R.	(none)
Carl Lamanna	Army Research Office	(none)
J. Oliver Lampen	Rutgers University	Introductory Remarks
Otto Landman	Georgetown University	(none)
Asger F. Langlykke	Squibb Institute for Medical Research	(none)
Allen I. Laskin	Squibb Institute for Medical Research	(none)
James H. Leathem	Rutgers University	(none)
Hubert A. Lechevalier	Rutgers University	(none)
Mary P. Lechevalier	Rutgers University	(none)
Peter Lengyel	New York University School of Medicine	(none)
R. Levere	Rockefeller Institute	(none)
Herman W. Lewis	National Science Foundation	(none)
A. Lindenmayer	Queens College	(none)
Laura R. Livingston	Yale University	(none)
S. E. Luria	Massachusetts Institute of Technology	Part V, Evolution of Proteins III: "On the Evolution of the Lactose Utilization Gene System in Enteric Bacteria"
Emanuel Margoliash	Abbott Laboratories	Part IV, Evolution of Proteins II: "Structural and Functional Aspects of Cytochrome c in Relation to Evolution"
Paul Margolin	Cold Spring Harbor Laboratory	(none)
Julius Marmur	Albert Einstein College of Medicine	Part VII, Evolution of Genes I: "Nature of Bacteriophages Induced in Bacillus subtilis"
William J. Marsheck, Jr.	Rutgers University	(none)
R. E. Maxwell	Parke-Davis Research Laboratories	(none)
Ernst Mayr	Harvard University	(none)
Brian McAuslan	Princeton University	(none)
Brian J. McCarthy	University of Washington	Part IX, Evolution of Genes III: "The Evolution of Polynucleotides"
Lloyd E. McDaniel	Rutgers University	(none)
William D. McElroy	Johns Hopkins University	Part V, Evolution of Proteins III: "Enzyme Catalysis and Color of Light in Bioluminescent Reactions"
William L. McLellan, Jr.	Rutgers University	(none)
Mira Menon	Rutgers University	(none)
Stanley E. Mills	University of California, San Diego	Part V, Evolution of Proteins III: "The Evolution of an Enzyme"
Vivian Moses	University of California, Berkeley	Part IX, Evolution of Genes III: "Molecular Regulation and Its Possible Evolutionary Significance"
Steven Nagy	Rutgers University	(none)
Masayasu Nakano	Rutgers University	(none)
Alvin Nason	Johns Hopkins University	(none)
Daniel Nathans	Johns Hopkins School of Medicine	(none)
Aubrey W. Naylor	Duke University	(none)
Martin Nemer	Institute for Cancer Research	(none)
Norbert P. Neumann	Rutgers University	(none)
Walter J. Nickerson	Rutgers University	(none)
Jorge Ortigoza-Ferado	Rutgers University	(none)
Nozomu Otsuji	Yale University	(none)
Nicholas C. Palczuk	Rutgers University	(none)
A. M. Pappenheimer, Jr.	Harvard University	(none)
Linus Pauling	California Institute of Technology	Part III, Evolution of Proteins I: "Evolutionary Divergence and Convergence in Proteins"
Jacques J. Pène	Albert Einstein College of Medicine	(none)
D. Perlman	Squibb Institute for Medical Research	(none)
Robert Perry	Institute for Cancer Research	(none)
Roman J. Pienta	Rutgers University	(none)
Otto J. Plescia	Rutgers University	(none)
Cyril Ponnamperuma	NASA Ames Research Center	(none)
Van Rensselaer Potter	University of Wisconsin Medical School	(none)
David Pramer	Rutgers University	(none)
Carl A. Price	Rutgers University	(none)
Martha W. Rancourt	Douglass College (Rutgers University)	(none)
C. V. N. Rao	Rutgers University	(none)
Eugene E. Reilly	Rutgers University	(none)
Alexander Rich	Massachusetts Institute of Technology	Part VIII, Evolution of Genes II: "Evolutionary Problems in the Synthesis of Proteins"
L. Rinaldini	University of Cordoba	(none)
Richard B. Roberts	Carnegie Institution of Washington	Part IX, Evolution of Genes III: "The Evolution of Polynucleotides"
Palmer Rogers	University of Minnesota	(none)
Harriet Rouse	Rutgers Medical School	(none)
George Rudkin	Institute for Cancer Research	(none)
William J. Rutter	University of Illinois at Urbana-Champaign	Part IV, Evolution of Proteins II: "Enzymatic Homology and Analogy in Phylogeny"
Ruth Sager	Columbia University	Part IX, Evolution of Genes III: "On the Evolution of Genetic Systems"
Stanley Salthe	Brandeis University	(none)
K. E. Sanderson	Brookhaven National Laboratory	(none)
Melvin Santer	Haverford College	(none)
Ursula Santer	Haverford College	(none)
Grady F. Saunders	University of Illinois at Urbana-Champaign	(none)
Priscilla Saunders	University of Illinois at Urbana-Champaign	(none)
Barbara Scher	Albert Einstein College of Medicine	(none)
William I. Scher, Jr.	Rockefeller Institute	(none)
R. Walter Schlesinger	Rutgers Medical School	(none)
Jack Schultz	Institute for Cancer Research	(none)
Stanley A. Schwartz	Rutgers University	(none)
H. H. Seliger	Johns Hopkins University	Part V, Evolution of Proteins III: "Enzyme Catalysis and Color of Light in Bioluminescent Reactions"
M. Shilo	Hebrew University, Hadassah Medical School	(none)
Yoshiro Shimura	Johns Hopkins University School of Medicine	(none)
Gerald D. Shockman	Temple University School of Medicine	(none)
Gilbert Shull	E. R. Squibb and Sons	(none)
Eli C. Siegel	Rutgers University	(none)
Philip Siekevitz	Rockefeller Institute	(none)
Melvin V. Simpson	Dartmouth Medical School	(none)
Emil L. Smith	UCLA School of Medicine	Part IV, Evolution of Proteins II: Chairman; "Structural and Functional Aspects of Cytochrome c in Relation to Evolution"
Lucile Smith	Dartmouth Medical School	(none)
J. F. Snell	Ohio State University	(none)
Tracy M. Sonneborn	Indiana University	Part VI, Evening Lecture: "Degeneracy of the Genetic Code: Extent, Nature, and Genetic Implications"
Lee M. Spetner	Johns Hopkins University	(none)
Joseph F. Speyer	Cold Spring Harbor Laboratory	(none)
Sol Spiegelman	University of Illinois at Urbana-Champaign	Part IX, Evolution of Genes III: "The Relation of Ribosomal RNA to the Genome"
David B. Sprinson	Columbia University	(none)
DeWitt Stetten, Jr.	Rutgers Medical School	(none)
Marjorie R. Stetten	Rutgers Medical School	(none)
Thomas M. Stevens	Rutgers Medical School	(none)
Elliott H. Stonehill	Sloan-Kettering Institute for Cancer Research	(none)
T. Stoudt	Merck, Sharp and Dohme	(none)
Alice Strampp	Rutgers University	(none)
Murray Strassman	Albert Einstein Medical Center	(none)
David B. Straus	Princeton University	(none)
William A. Strohl	Rutgers Medical School	(none)
David H. Strumeyer	Rutgers University	(none)
T. V. Subbaiah	Albert Einstein College of Medicine	Part VII, Evolution of Genes I: "Nature of Bacteriophages Induced in Bacillus subtilis"
Noboru Sueoka	Princeton University	Part VIII, Evolution of Genes II: "On the Evolution of Informational Macromolecules"
Sigmund R. Suskind	Johns Hopkins University	(none)
H. E. Swartz	Rutgers University	(none)
E. Bland Symington	Rutgers University	(none)
Sara Szuchet	Princeton University	(none)
Katsuhiko Tago	Rutgers University	(none)
David W. Talmage	University of Colorado School of Medicine	(none)
E. L. Tatum	Rockefeller Institute	Opening Address: "Evolution and Molecular Biology"
S. R. Taub	Princeton University	(none)
M. Wright Taylor	Rutgers University	(none)
Kenneth V. Thimann	Harvard University	Part I, Evolution of Pathways I: Chairman
Charles A. Thomas	Johns Hopkins University	(none)
Wayne W. Umbreit	Rutgers University	(none)
Leon Unger	Rutgers University	(none)
C. B. van Niel	Hopkins Marine Station, Hadassah Medical School	Part II, Evolution of Pathways II: Chairman
Henry J. Vogel	Rutgers University	Editor; Part I, Evolution of Pathways I: "Lysine Biosynthesis and Evolution"
Ruth H. Vogel	Rutgers University	(none)
John M. Ward	National Science Foundation	(none)
Jonathan R. Warner	Albert Einstein College of Medicine	(none)
Eva L. Weinreb	New York University	(none)
Charles Weissmann	New York University School of Medicine	(none)
David White	NASA Ames Research Center	(none)
Curtis A. Williams	Rockefeller Institute	(none)
Oskar Wintersteiner	Squibb Institute for Medical Research	(none)
H. Boyd Woodruff	Merck, Sharp and Dohme	(none)
Barbara Kalckar Wright	Massachusetts General Hospital	(none)
Tetsuo Yamane	Princeton University	(none)
Saul A. Yankofsky	University of Illinois at Urbana-Champaign	Part IX, Evolution of Genes III: "The Relation of Ribosomal RNA to the Genome"
Charles Yanofsky	Stanford University	(none)
Martynas Yčas	State University of New York	(none)
Akira Yoshida	National Institutes of Health	Part V, Evolution of Proteins III: "The Role of Mutations in Evolution"
Emile Zuckerkandl	Laboratoire de Physico-Chimie Colloidale	Part III, Evolution of Proteins I: "Evolutionary Divergence and Convergence in Proteins"
