= Non-Darwinian Evolution (paper) =

1969 scientific biology paper

"Non-Darwinian Evolution" is a scientific paper written by Jack Lester King and Thomas H. Jukes and published in 1969. It is credited, along with Motoo Kimura's 1968 paper "Evolutionary Rate at the Molecular Level", with proposing what became known as the neutral theory of molecular evolution. The paper brings together a wide variety of evidence, ranging from protein sequence comparisons to studies of the Treffers mutator gene in E. coli to analysis of the genetic code to comparative immunology, to argue that most protein evolution is due to neutral mutations and genetic drift. It was published in the journal Science on May 16, 1969.

The idea of evolution at the molecular level being driven by the random processes of mutation and genetic drift, largely independent from natural selection, was controversial at the time; the provocative title further emphasized the break with mainstream evolutionary thought, which was dominated by the synthetic theory of evolution, often referred to as "Neo-Darwinism". Although they argued for essentially the same conclusion as Motoo Kimura's earlier paper, King and Jukes criticized one of Kimura's central arguments, an estimate of the rate of amino acid change in proteins that according to Kimura would indicate an impossibly high genetic load if the changes were caused by natural selection. The paper was initially rejected by its reviewers (one thought it was trivial and the other thought it was totally wrong ), but was published after an appeal. This time, the reviewer was James F. Crow, Motoo Kimura's collaborator. Despite the intentionally inflammatory title and "antiauthoritarian tone"—which according to historian Michael R. Dietrich "undoubtedly struck a nerve", especially since King and Jukes worked at UC Berkeley during that period of political unrest—the paper acknowledges the significance of natural selection; it merely argues against panselectionism (as advocated at the molecular level by G. G. Simpson and Emil L. Smith in particular). From 1969 until the early 1970s, the concept of neutral mutations driven to fixation by genetic drift was known as "Non-Darwinian Evolution"; it was subsequently termed the "neutral theory of molecular evolution".

"Non-Darwinian Evolution" generated considerable interest in neutral mutations, and became very influential in the field of molecular evolution. The response by critics (including direct rebuttals by Bryan Clarke and Rollin Richmond), and subsequent replies (by King and Jukes, Kimura, and others), marked the beginning of the neutralist/selectionist controversy. In the 1970s and 1980s, Kimura became the chief advocate of the neutral theory, but he adopted a number of King and Jukes' arguments and de-emphasized genetic load.

== See also ==
- History of evolutionary thought
- History of molecular evolution
