= Morris Goodman (scientist) =

American scientist

Morris Goodman (1925 – November 14, 2010, Michigan) was an American scientist known for his work in molecular evolution and molecular systematics. Goodman was a distinguished professor at the Center for Molecular Medicine and Genetics at Wayne State University School of Medicine, editor-in-chief of the journal Molecular Phylogenetics and Evolution, and a member of the anthropology section of the United States National Academy of Sciences.

== Life and work ==
Goodman grew up in Milwaukee, Wisconsin, and spent many years in Detroit, Michigan as the only Wayne State University faculty member appointed to the National Academy of Science until his death on November 14, 2010. After high school, he attended the University of Wisconsin-Madison for one year, then in 1943 entered the Army Air Forces, where he served as a navigator for the remainder of World War II. He was married in 1946, shortly after returning to college. He became interested in science after a comparative anatomy course; the professor, Harold Wolfe, recruited him as a teaching assistant. Goodman graduated with a degree in zoology and a minor in biochemistry, and continued on at Wisconsin for his master's and Ph.D. degrees under Wolfe (a former student of Alan Boyden). Upon finishing a dissertation on the antigen-antibody precipitin reaction, he went to Caltech for post-doctoral work, supported by an NIH fellowship.

Working with Dan Campbell at Caltech (within the Division of Chemistry headed by Linus Pauling), Goodman worked on the immunological properties of hemoglobins, including the immunological differences between normal and sickle-cell hemoglobin. According to a 2004 interview, Goodman became interested in evolutionary problems around 1957–1958. After research stints at the University of Illinois Medical School and the Detroit Institute of Cancer Research, he embarked—with his friend Morris Wilson—on studies of the degree of variability in proteins expressed early vs. late in development.

By 1961, Goodman's comparative immunology research produced some results, particularly on the evolutionary relationships among primates, that were attracting interest from evolutionary biologists. He presented his ideas at the New York Academy of Sciences and the Wenner-Gren Foundation for Anthropological Research. At the latter meeting, he and two others using molecular approaches to evolutionary problems (Emile Zuckerkandl and Harold Klinger) were confronted by three of the "framers" of the modern evolutionary synthesis: Ernst Mayr, G. G. Simpson, and Theodosius Dobzhansky. During the early history of molecular evolution, traditional evolutionists were both interested in and apprehensive about the advent of molecular techniques to evolutionary biology; Simpson later referred to Goodman as "an old friendly antagonist.".

Through the 1960s and 1970s, Goodman continued his evolutionary work based on serology, eventually with graduate students working under him. In the 1970s he also started using protein sequence data for his molecular taxonomy work. In a 1975 paper in Nature, Goodman and his collaborators used sequence data to reconstruct the evolutionary history of hemoglobin (including possible ancestral sequences) and analyze which sites on the hemoglobin complex had evolved at which stages. Goodman called this the first "hard evidence of Darwinian evolution". In 1982, with another Nature paper, Goodman did the same for the DNA sequences of the hemoglobin genes.
