= Thomas Jukes =

Thomas Jukes may refer to:

- Thomas H. Jukes, biologist
- Thomas Jukes (MP) (died 1628), MP for Bishop's Castle (UK Parliament constituency) and Montgomery Boroughs
