= C12orf54 =

Protein-coding gene in humans

Identifiers
- Aliases: C12orf54, HSD-29, HSD-30, chromosome 12 open reading frame 54, Chromosome 12 Open Reading Frame 54
- External IDs: HomoloGene: 82303; GeneCards: C12orf54; OMA:C12orf54 - orthologs

Gene location (Human)
| Chr. | Chromosome 12 (human) |
| Band | 12q13.11 | Start | 48,482,498 bp |
| Band | 12q13.11 | End | 48,496,524 bp |
RNA expression pattern
| Bgee | Human / Mouse (ortholog); Top expressed in: sperm; left testis; right testis; pancreatic ductal cell; testicle; endothelial cell; palpebral conjunctiva; vagina; gingival epithelium; left ovary / n/a; More reference expression data |
| BioGPS | n/a |
Orthologs
| Species | Human | Mouse |
| Entrez | 121273 | n/a |
| Ensembl | ENSG00000177627 | n/a |
| UniProt | Q6X4T0 | n/a |
| RefSeq (mRNA) | NM_152319 | n/a |
| RefSeq (protein) | NP_689532; NP_689532.1 | n/a |
| Location (UCSC) | Chr 12: 48.48 – 48.5 Mb | n/a |
| PubMed search | | n/a |
- Wikidata
| View/Edit Human |

C12orf54 (chromosome 12 open reading frame 54) is a protein in humans that is encoded by the C12orf54 gene.

== Gene ==
C12orf54, chromosome 12 open reading frame 54, also known as HSD-29 (hydroxysteroid 29 dehydrogenase) and HSD-30 (hydroxysteroid 30 dehydrogenase) is a protein coding gene. The accession number for this gene is NM_152319.4.

=== Locus ===
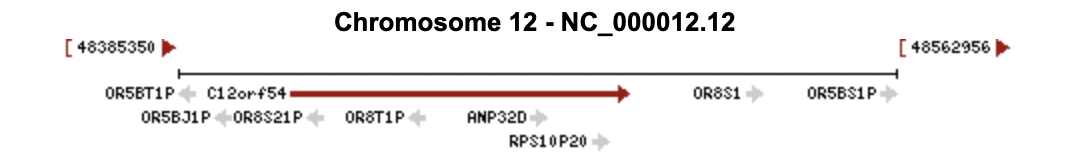
Human C12orf54 Gene Locus provided by NCBI Gene

Homo sapiens C12orf54 can be found on chromosome 12 (12q13.11) and consists of 15 exons.

=== Expression ===
C12orf54 is expressed in most major tissues. Human C12orf54 is expressed at slightly elevated levels within the testes compared to other tissues although this gene is primarily expressed ubiquitously among various tissues.

== Protein ==
The C12orf54 protein consists of 127 amino acids. C12orf54 has a predicted molecular weight of 14.5 kdal and a theoretical isoelectric point of 8.66.

=== Structure ===
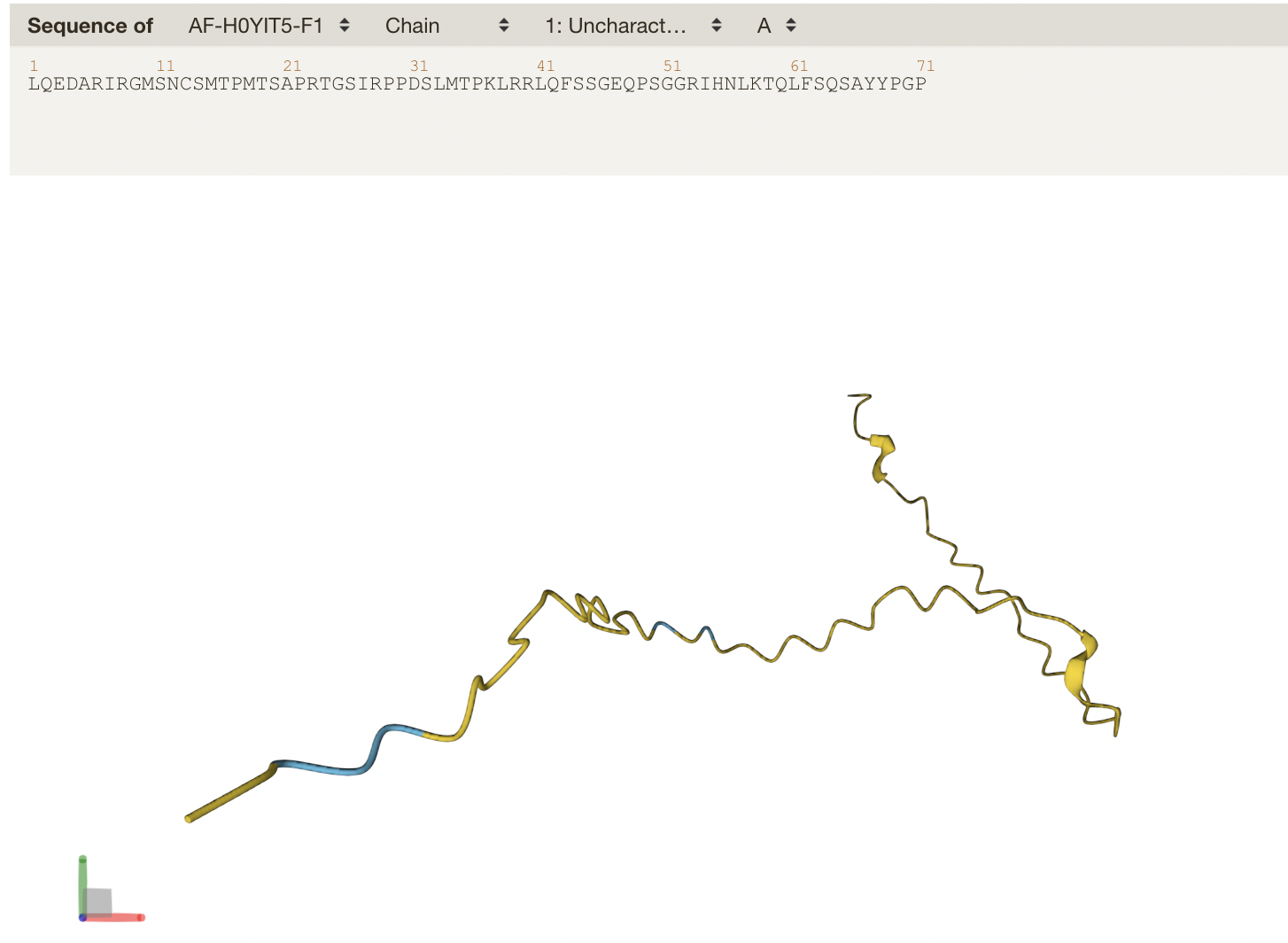
Alphafold predicted tertiary structure of Human C12orf54 protein

The predicted tertiary structure of C12orf54, determined that the most highly conserved amino acids are scattered throughout the protein mainly being towards the end.

=== Localization ===
C12orf54 is predicted to be primarily expressed within the nucleus. There is also predicted localization within the cytoplasm which justifies this protein having a nuclear export signal which means that the Human C12orf54 protein goes between both the nucleus and the cytoplasm.

=== Post-translational modifications ===
C12orf54 has several predicted post-translational modifications including phosphorylation and YinOYang sites.

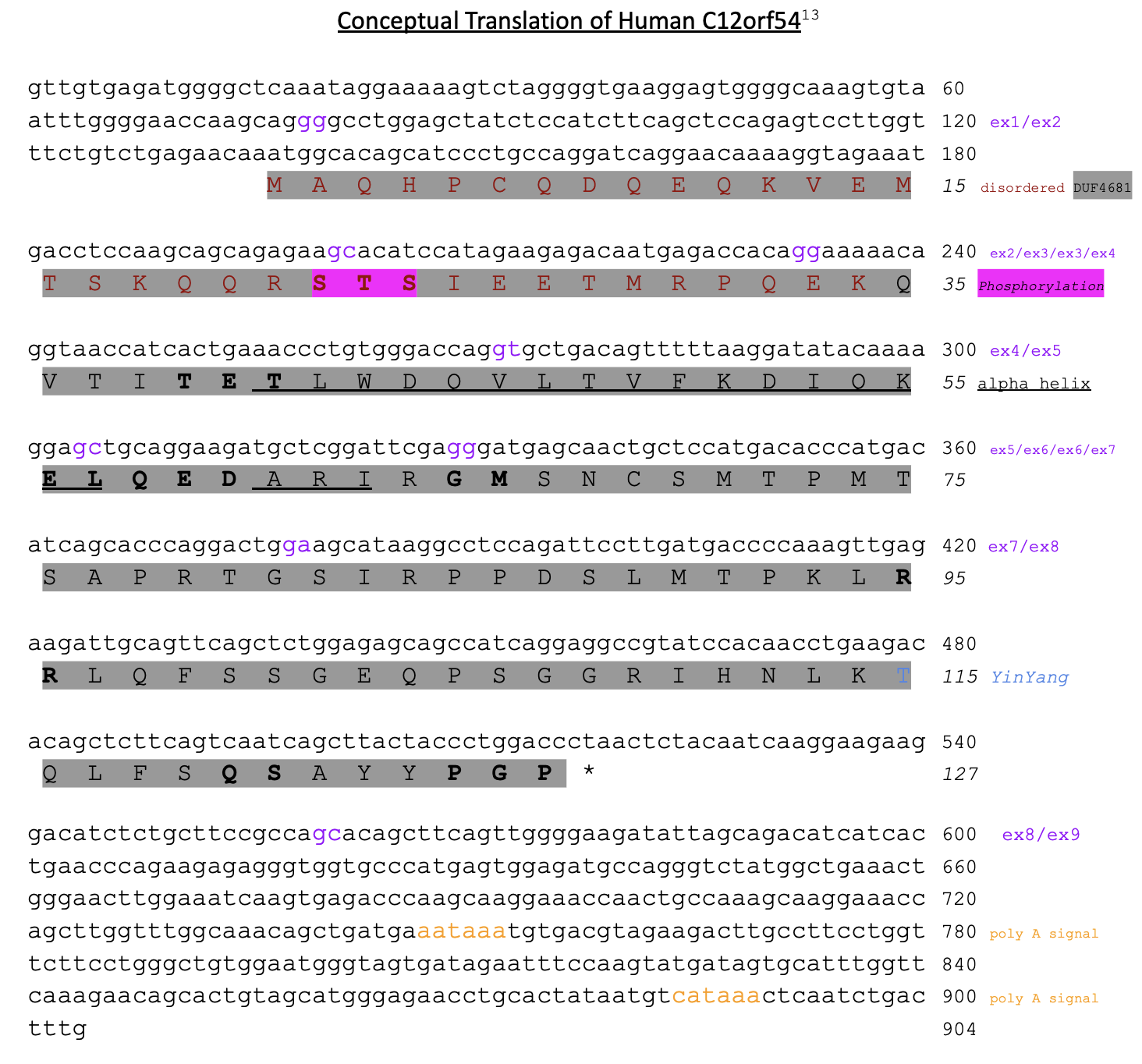
Conceptual Translation of C12orf54

== Homologs ==
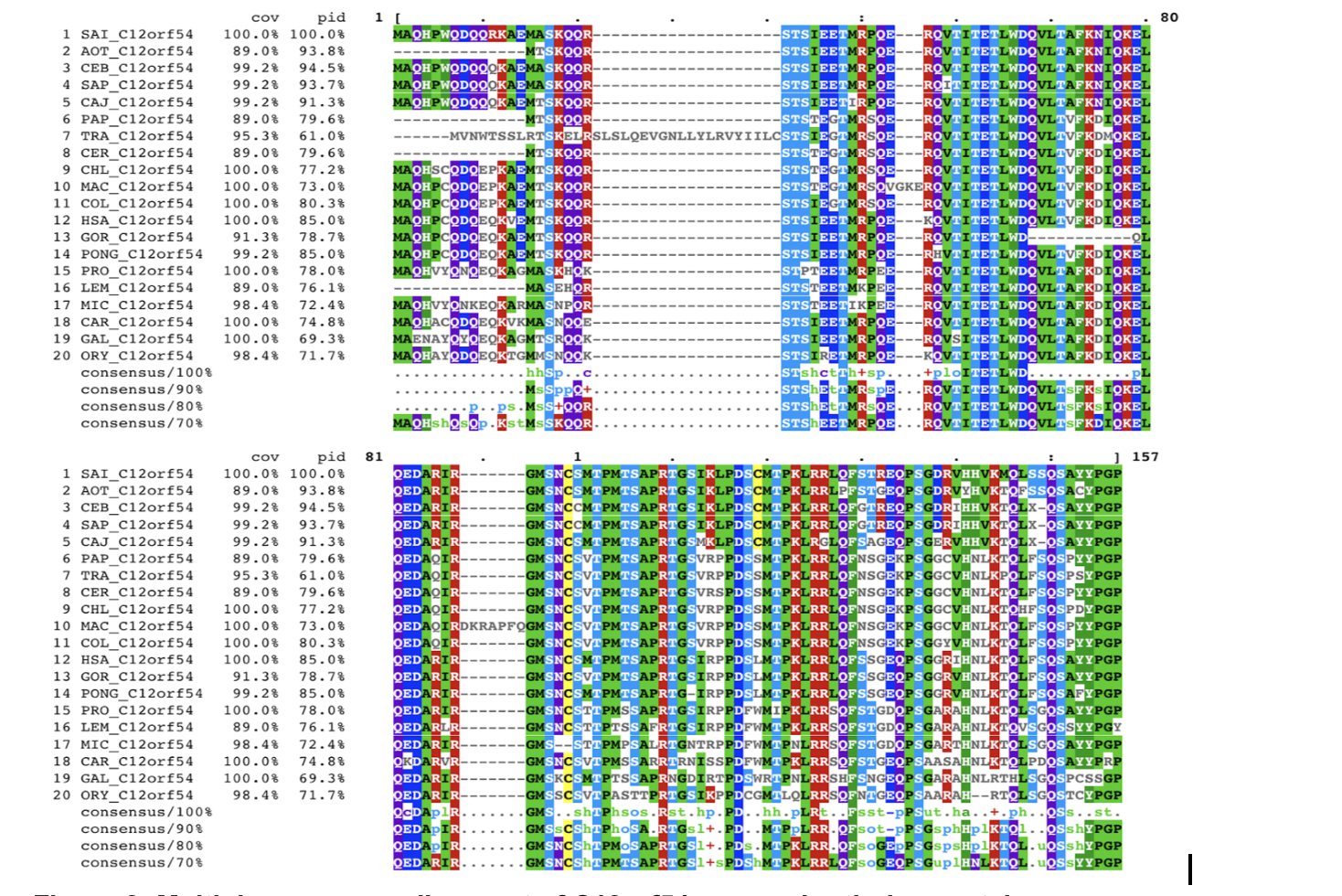
Multiple Sequence Alignment of C12orf54 Mammal Ortholog Protein Sequences

=== Orthologs ===
There are known orthologs of C12orf54 found in mammals but not amphibians, reptiles, invertebrates, birds and fish.

| Mammals | Genus and species | Common name | Taxon | DoD(MYA) | Accession # | Length (AA) | Sequence identity (%) | Sequence similarity (%) |
| | Homo sapiens | Human | Primate | 0 | NP_689532.1 | 127 | 100 | 100 |
| | Gorilla gorilla gorilla | Gorilla | Primate | 8.6 | XP_018893572.1 | 116 | 88 | 90 |
| | Pongo abelil | Sumatran Orangutan | Primate | 15.2 | XP_002823203.1 | 126 | 95 | 97 |
| | Colobus angolensis palliatus | Colobus monkey | Primate | 28.9 | XP_011791632.1 | 126 | 89 | 94 |
| | Papio anubis | olive baboon | Primate | 28.9 | XP_009178904.1 | 113 | 88 | 94 |
| | Cercocebus atys | Sooty mangabey | Primate | 28.9 | XP_011903881.1 | 113 | 88 | 93 |
| | Macaca nemestrina | Southern pig-tailed macaque | Primate | 28.9 | XP_011758585.1 | 137 | 82 | 86 |
| | Chlorocebus sabaeus | Green monkey | Primate | 28.9 | XP_008001251.2 | 127 | 86 | 91 |
| | Trachypithecus francoisi | Leaf monkey | Primate | 28.9 | XP_033079378.1 | 141 | 86 | 93 |
| | Cebus imitator | Panamanian white-faced capuchin | Primate | 43 | XP_017401188.1 | 126 | 85 | 90 |
| | Aotus nanymaae | Nancy Ma's night monkey | Primate | 43 | XP_012296662.1 | 113 | 86 | 92 |
| | Saimiri boliviensis boliviensis | Squirrel monkey | Primate | 43 | XP_003927823.1 | 127 | 85 | 92 |
| | Callithrix jacchus | Common marmoset | Primate | 43 | XP_017832079.1 | 126 | 85 | 92 |
| | Sapajus apella | Tufted capuchin | Primate | 43 | XP_032142168.1 | 126 | 84 | 90 |
| | Carlito syrichta | Philippine tarsier | Primate | 69 | XP_008062124.1 | 127 | 79 | 85 |
| | Propithecus coquereli | Coquerel's sifaka | Primate | 74 | XP_012493895.1 | 127 | 80 | 85 |
| | Lemur catta | Ring-tailed lemur | Primate | 74 | XP_045411017.1 | 113 | 79 | 87 |
| | Microcebus murinus | Grey mouse lemur | Primate | 74 | XP_012612622.1 | 125 | 75 | 81 |
| | Galeopterus variegatus | Sunda flying lemur | Primate | 79 | XP_008582693.1 | 127 | 73 | 80 |
| | Oryctolagus cuniculus | European rabbit | Rodentia | 87 | XP_008254622.1 | 125 | 74 | 81 |

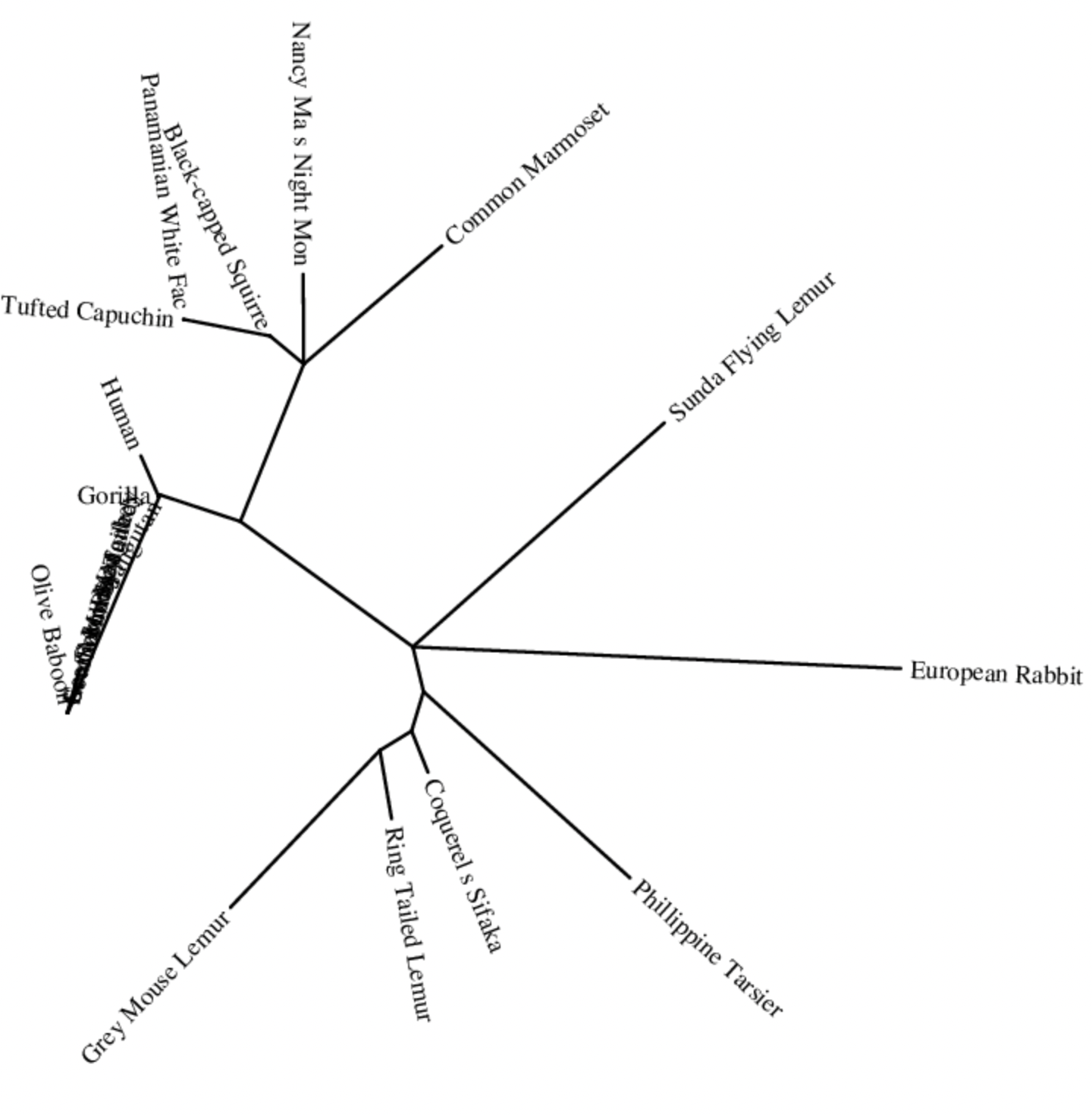
C12orf54 unrooted phylogenetic tree of mammal orthologs

=== Evolution ===
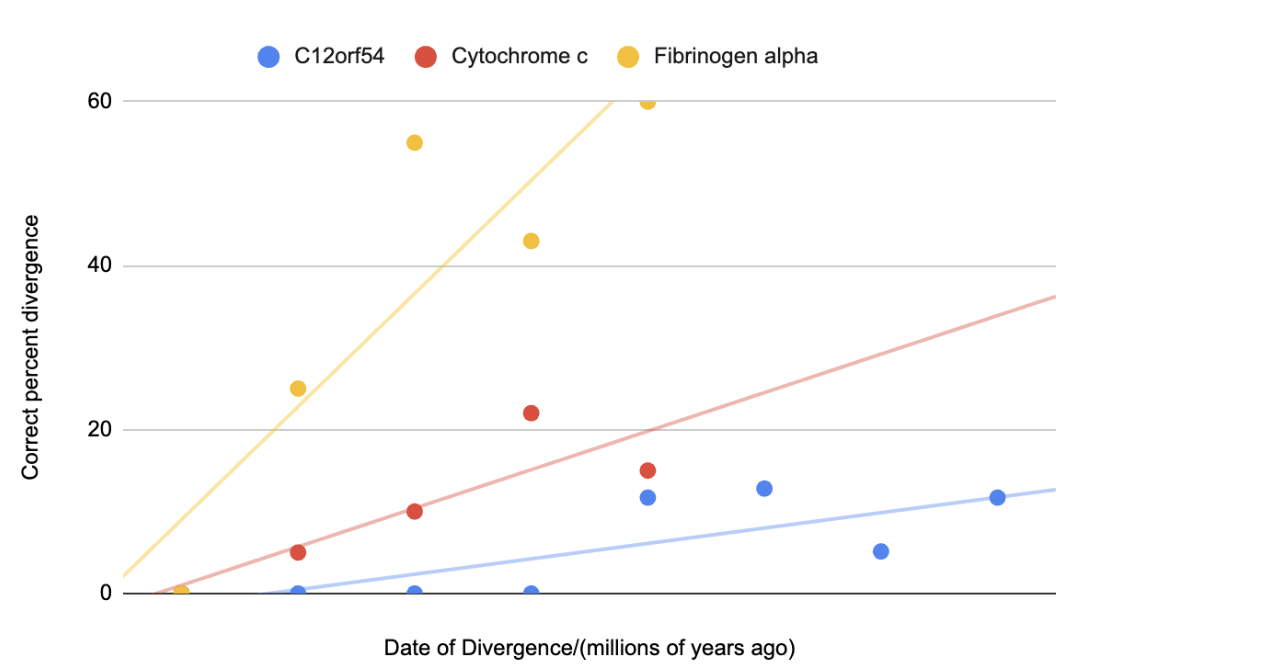
Graph of correct percent divergence vs Median Date of Divergence. Blue represents C12orf54 Red represents cytochrome c Yellow represents fibrinogen alpha

C12orf54 is estimated to first have appeared 87 million years ago in rodents. The rate of molecular evolution for C12orf54 was relatively slow since it was slightly lower than Cytochrome C and less rapid than the evolution rate of Fibrinogen Alpha showing that C12orf54 does not evolve rapidly.
