= Jack Lester King =

American evolutionary biologist (1934–1983)

Jack Lester King (March 9, 1934 – June 29, 1983) was an American evolutionary biologist best known for co-authoring (with Thomas H. Jukes) a seminal paper on the neutral theory of molecular evolution, "Non-Darwinian Evolution".

King was born in Oakland, California and received both undergraduate and doctoral training at the University of California, Berkeley, earning a Ph.D. in Zoology in 1963. From 1963 to 1969, he remained at UC Berkeley as a postdoctoral fellow in population genetics, then independent researcher in biophysics, at the Donner Laboratory. In 1969, King became a professor at University of California, Santa Barbara.

King and Jukes' "Non-Darwinian Evolution", published in Science in 1969 shortly after Motoo Kimura first mooted the neutral theory, brought together a variety of experimental evidence and theoretical arguments in support of the idea that the vast majority of mutations, at the molecular level, are neither beneficial nor harmful. As the intentionally provocative title implies, King and Jukes suggested that for most molecular evolution, genetic drift rather than natural selection is the main factor. King himself was "a staunch but progressive Darwinian", but he enjoyed the strong reactions the paper provoked. This marked the beginning of the controversy over neutral evolution and the "neutralist-selectionist debate", primarily between organismal and molecular biologists, which would continue throughout King's career. His later work in this area focused on neutral substitutions, isoalleles, and the measurement of variation through electrophoresis. He married twice, with six children from his first marriage, and two from his second, to Ethel.

King became an associate editor of the Journal of Molecular Evolution in 1971, shortly after the journal's founding. He co-authored a 1981 textbook, Biology, The Science of Life. King died unexpectedly in 1983 from a brain hemorrhage caused by acute myelomonocytic leukemia.
