= PROGEN =

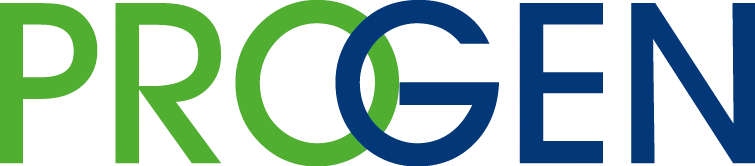
- Type: Private
- Industry: Biotechnology
- Founded: 1983
- Founders: Werner W. Franke; Günter Hämmerling; Ekkehard Bautz; Peter Gruss
- Headquarters: Heidelberg, Germany
- Parent: R-Biopharm
- Website: progen.com

PROGEN Biotechnik GmbH, commonly known as PROGEN, is a biotechnology company headquartered in Heidelberg, Germany, focused on research antibodies and analytical tools for gene therapy, particularly adeno associated virus assays. The company was founded in 1983 by four Heidelberg professors as a spin-off from the German Cancer Research Center and Heidelberg University, and since 2012 it has operated as a wholly owned subsidiary of R-Biopharm.

== History ==
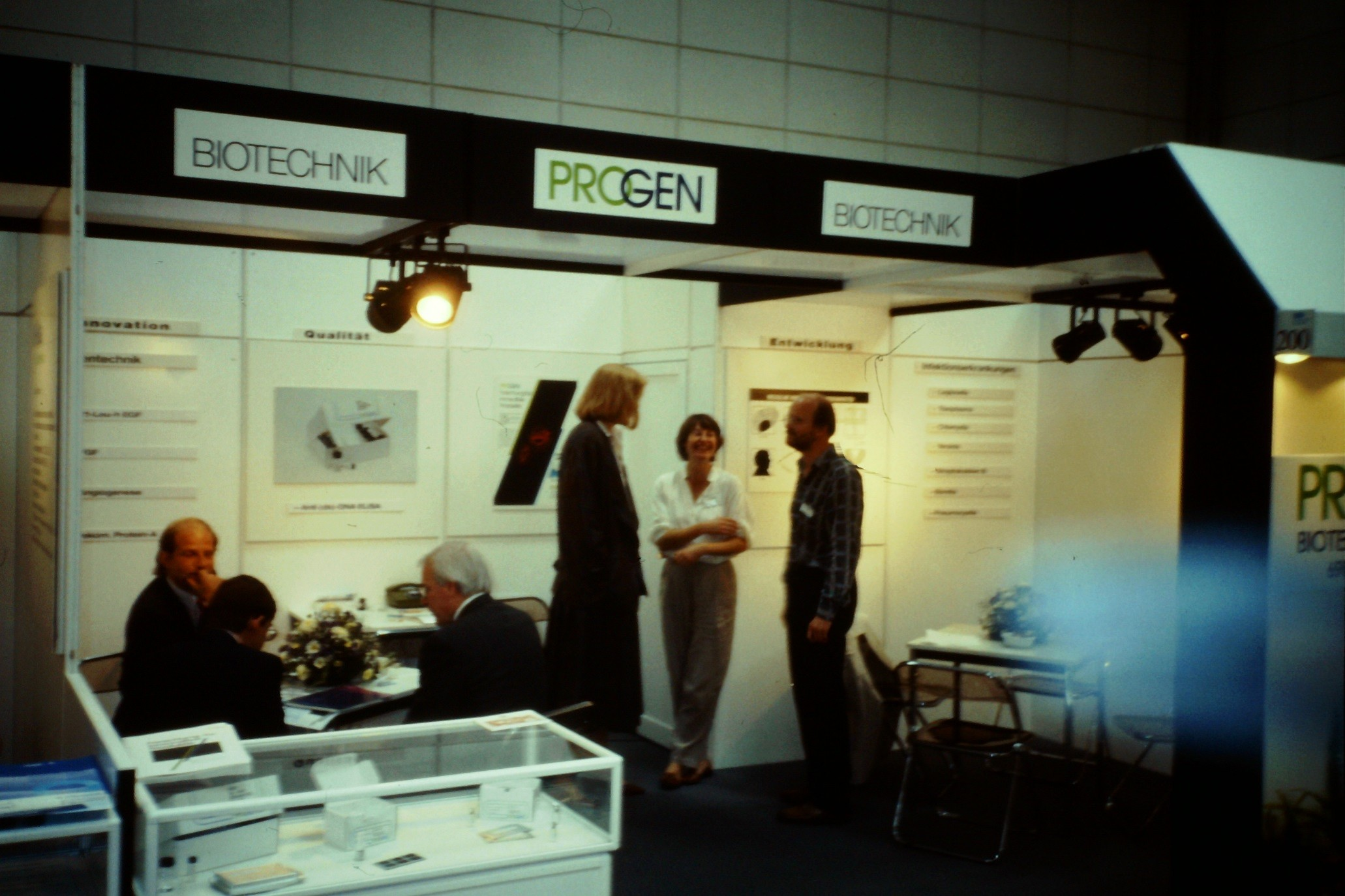
PROGEN booth at the Biotechnica Conference in 1987

PROGEN's history goes back to autumn 1983 when Werner W. Franke and Günter Hämmerling of the German Cancer Research Center together with Ekkehard Bautz and Peter Gruss of Heidelberg University established a company to scale the distribution of research reagents emerging from their laboratories. The founders launched the venture with a starting capital of 100,000 German marks, at a time when academic entrepreneurship in Germany was still viewed skeptically by university leadership.

PROGEN's early product was built directly on cell biology work in Heidelberg as Franke's group defined tissue-specific patterns of intermediate filament proteins and developed antibodies for cytokeratins that became widely used in tumor pathology and cancer research. In parallel, Bautz contributed an ELISA-based procedure for detecting hantaviruses. In the early 2000s, it shifted its focus toward adeno-associated virus analytics as AAV vectors rose in prominence for gene therapy, due to Jürgen Kleinschmidt's AAV particle antibodies and ELISA kits developed at the German Cancer Research Center.

In 2009, PROGEN divested its diabetes point-of-care business to Axis-Shield GmbH. In 2012, PROGEN was acquired by R-Biopharm AG. In 2019, the company obtained exclusive worldwide licenses for Adeno-Associated Virus (AAV) antibodies and ELISA systems developed by the DKFZ. In 2021, PROGEN entered a distribution agreement with Thermo Fisher Scientific. In 2023, PROGEN opened a subsidiary in the United States.

== Products ==
PROGEN produces antibodies targeting cytoskeletal and cell junction proteins for applications in cell biology, oncology, and virology. It also develops analytical tools for gene therapy, specifically ELISA kits and antibodies used for AAV vector quantification and titration.
