= Semantide =

Type of macromolecule

Semantides (or semantophoretic molecules) are biological macromolecules that carry genetic information or a transcript thereof. Three different categories of semantides are distinguished: primary, secondary and tertiary. Primary Semantides are genes, which consist of DNA. Secondary semantides are chains of messenger RNA, which are transcribed from DNA. Tertiary semantides are polypeptides, which are translated from messenger RNA. In eukaryotic organisms, primary semantides may consist of nuclear, mitochondrial or plastid DNA. Not all primary semantides ultimately form tertiary semantides. Some primary semantides are not transcribed into mRNA (non-coding DNA) and some secondary semantides are not translated into polypeptides (non-coding RNA). The complexity of semantides varies greatly. For tertiary semantides, large globular polypeptide chains are most complex while structural proteins, consisting of repeating simple sequences, are least complex. The term semantide and related terms were coined by Linus Pauling and Emile Zuckerkandl. Although semantides are the major type of data used in modern phylogenetics, the term itself is not commonly used.

== Related terms ==
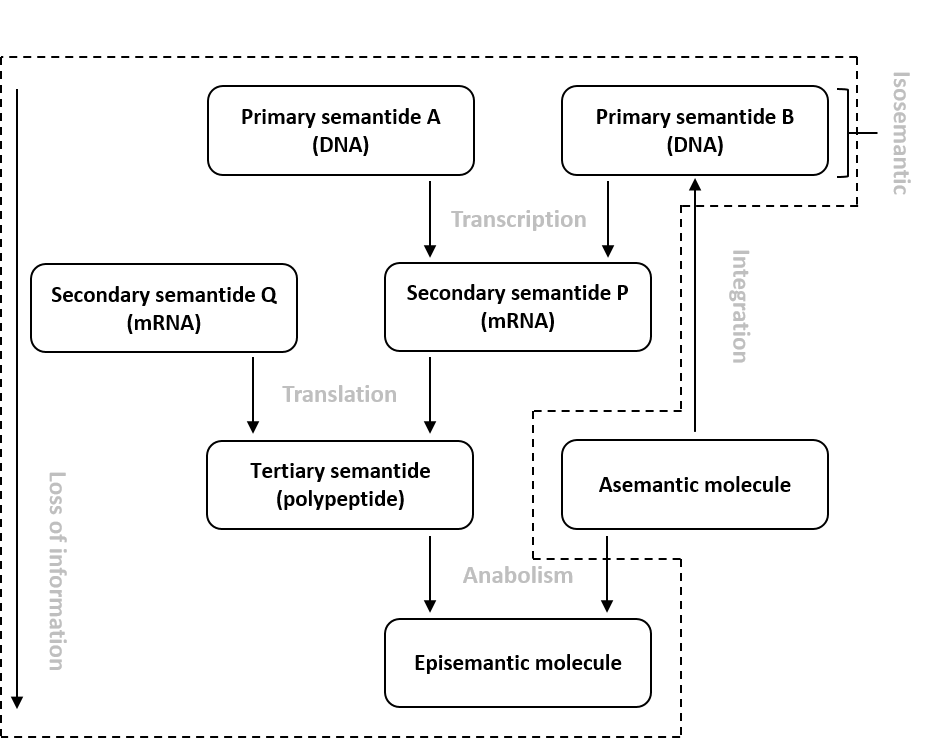
Schematic representation of the relationship between semantides and related terms. In this example, primary semantide A and B as well as secondary semantide P and Q are isosemantic. From top to bottom (within the dotted line), information for phylogenetics is lost.

=== Isosemantic ===
DNA or RNA that differs in base sequence, but translate into identical polypeptide chains are referred to as being isosemantic.

=== Episemantic ===
Molecules that are synthesized by enzymes (tertiary semantides) are referred to as episemantic molecules. Episemantic molecules have a larger variety in types than semantides, which only consist of three types (DNA, RNA or polypeptides). Not all polypeptides are tertiary semantides. Some, mainly small polypeptides, can also be episemantic molecules.

=== Asemantic ===
Molecules that are not produced by an organism are referred to as asemantic molecules, because they do not contain any genetic information. Asementic molecules may be changed into episemantic molecules by anabolic processes. Asemantic molecules may also become semantic molecules when they integrate into a genome. Certain viruses and episomes have this ability.

When referring to a molecule as being semantic, episemantic or asemantic, then this only applies to a specific organism. A semantic molecule for one organism may be asemantic for another organism.

== Research applications ==
Semantides are used as phylogenetic information for studying the evolutionary history of organisms. Primary semantides are also used in comparative biodiversity analyses. However, since extracellular DNA can persist for some time, these types of analysis cannot discern active from inactive and or dead organisms.

The extent to which biological macromolecules are informative for studying evolutionary history differs. The more complex a molecule, the more informative it contains for phylogenetics. Primary and secondary semantides contain the most information. In tertiary semantides, some information is lost, because many amino acids are coded for by more than one codon.

Episemantic molecules (e.g. carotenoids) are also informative for phylogenetics. However, the distributions of these molecules do not correlate perfectly with phylogenies based on semantides. Therefore, independent confirmation is often still needed. The more enzymes involved in a synthesis pathway, the more unlikely that such pathways have evolved separately. Therefore, for episemantic molecules, molecules that are synthesized from the least complex asemantic molecules are the most informative in phylogenetics. However, different pathways may synthesize similar or even identical molecules. For example, in animals, plants and other eukaryotes, different pathways have been found for vitamin C synthesis. Therefore, certain molecules should not be used for studying phylogenetic relationships.

Although asemantic molecules could indicate some quantitative or qualitative features of a group of organisms, they are considered to be unreliable and uninformative for phylogenetics.

Analyses using different semantides may yield conflicting phylogenies. However, if the phylogenies are congruent, then there is more support for the evolutionary relationship. By analyzing larger sequences (e.g. complete mitochondrial genome sequences), phylogenies can be constructed, which are more resolved and have more support.

== Examples ==
Semantides often used in studies are common to most organisms and are known to only change slowly over time. Examples of these macromolecules are:

- ATPase
- Cytochrome b
- Cytochrome c oxidase subunit I
- Heat shock protein genes
- Histone H3
- RecA
- Recombination activating gene 1
- Ribonuclease P RNA
- Ribosomal DNA (e.g. 28S rDNA)
- Ribosomal RNA (e.g. 16S rRNA)
