= Mavis Jukes =

American author of novels for children (born 1947)

Dorothy Mavis Jukes (pseudonym Iris Hudson; born May 3, 1947) is an American author of novels for children. She has also published nonfiction books for children and pre-teens about puberty. Her books are usually health-based. She has also written the text for picture books under the name Iris Hudson.

== Biography ==
Mavis Jukes was born on May 3, 1947, in Nyack, New York. She is the daughter of Thomas Hughes Jukes, a famous molecular biologist and nutritionist, who pioneered the use of methotrexate as a new cancer therapy and was one of the first to formulate the neutral theory of molecular evolution.

She did her undergraduate studies at the University of California, Berkeley. Before becoming an author, Jukes was a licensed California attorney and a teacher. Jukes became inactive as an attorney in 1984. Her first book, ''No One is Going to Nashville", was published in 1983. She received the Newbery Honor distinction in 1985 for her book Like Jake and Me.

She lives with her husband, the sculptor and painter Robert H. Hudson, and their daughters in Cotati, Sonoma County, California.

== Publications ==
=== Fiction ===
- No One Is Going to Nashville (1983)
- Lights Around the Palm (1987)
- Getting Even (1988)
- Wild Iris Bloom (1993)
- I'll See You in My Dreams (1993)
- Losers Weepers (1997)
- Expecting the Unexpected (1999)
- Planning the Impossible (1999)
- Cinderella 2000 (2001)
- Blackberries in the Dark (2002)
- You're a Bear (2003)
- Like Jake and Me (2005)
- Smoke (2009)

As Iris Hudson

- Mac and the Messmaker, illus. Jerry SMith (New York: Kane Press, 2005), LCCN 2005-4551
- Ask Mia, illus. Blanche Sims (Kane, 2006), LCCN 2006-3546

=== Nonfiction ===
- Ladies' Business (1995)
- It's A Girl Thing (1996)
- Growing Up: It's a Girl Thing (1998)
- The Guy Book (2004)
- Be Healthy! It's A Girl Thing with Lillian Wai-Yin Cheung (2003)
