= Ekkehard Bautz =

German geneticist

Ekkehard Karl Friedrich Bautz is a molecular biologist and chair of the Institute of Molecular Genetics at the University of Heidelberg.

== Biography ==
He was born September 24, 1933, in Konstanz, Germany. After studying chemistry at Freiburg University and the University of Zürich, at the age of 26, he emigrated to the United States and later became a U.S. citizen. In 1961, he obtained a doctorate in molecular biology from the University of Wisconsin. He did postdoctoral work at the University of Illinois with a fellowship awarded by the Damon Runyon Memorial Fund for Cancer Research and in 1962 became an assistant professor at the Institute of Microbiology at Rutgers. In 1964, he participated in the Evolving Genes and Proteins Symposium, a landmark event in the history of molecular evolution research. In 1966, he was promoted to associate professor at the same institution. In 1970, he was appointed full professor there, but chose to return to Germany in the same year to become chair of the Institute of Molecular Genetics at the University of Heidelberg.

Bautz's most important discovery is that of sigma factor, the first known transcription factor.

== Scientific work ==
He developed methods for the isolation of messenger RNA and continued research on transcription. Later, he focused on novel selection methods, in particular phage display and the generation of recombinant antibodies.

In 1981, he founded the Center for Molecular Biology (ZMBH) in Heidelberg, where he served as chair of microbiology and acting director from 1983 to 1985.

== Professional activities ==
Bautz was on the editorial board of the Journal of Virology from 1966 to 1970, and of Molecular and General Genetics from 1971 to 2000. He was chairman of the German Genetics Society from 1979 to 1981, and a board member of the German Cancer Research Centre from 1978 to 1983. In 1994, he was appointed a board member of the Zentralkommission für Biologische Sicherheit (ZKBS, engl.: Central Commission for Biological Safety), advising the German government on the biological safety of genetically engineered organisms. He retired from the commission in 2000.

In 1983, he founded Progen GmbH, a biotech startup, with Werner Franke and two other scientists from Heidelberg. He is also a cofounder of Peptide Specialty Laboratories (PSL) and acted as general manager of Multimetrix GmbH from 2002 to 2007.

== Awards and honours ==
- Research Career Development Award, U.S. Public Health Service (1966-1970)
- American Chemical Society Award in Enzyme Chemistry (Pfizer Award, 1972)
- Ferdinand Springer Lectureship of the Federation of European Biochemical Societies (1973)
- Heidelberg Academy of Sciences, elected member (1977)
- Waksman Medal of Rutgers University (USA) (1999)
- University Medal, Heidelberg University (2000)
