= Like Jake and Me =

2005 novel by Mavis Jukes

- Author: Mavis Jukes
- Illustrator: Lloyd Bloom
- Language: English
- Genre: Children's literature, Young Adult, Early Children Books
- Publisher: Yearling Books
- Publication date: December 27, 2005
- Publication place: United States
- Media type: Print
- Pages: 64

Like Jake and Me is a children's novel by author Mavis Jukes with illustrations by Lloyd Bloom. It was published in 2005 by Yearling. Like Jake and Me was a Newbery Medal Honor book in 1985 and is a story about the difficult relationship between a stepfather and stepson and how they come to see eye to eye.

== Plot ==
Like Jake and Me is a story about a young boy named Alex whose mother has remarried and is expecting twins with Alex's new stepfather, Jake. Alex has a hard time bonding with Jake, and it makes Alex feel as if the two of them have little in common. Alex learns that even the strongest looking people have fears and also need help at times. An unexpected creature helps Alex and Jake build a closer relationship.

The story starts off with Alex watching his stepfather cut up wood for the fire place, and even though he looks strong, Alex decides to ask him if he needs any help. Jake brushes Alex off and carries on, which makes him feel out of bond with his stepfather. Alex goes on to talk to his pregnant mother Virginia who is expecting twins. She is checking up on her pear tree and had pushed a glass bottle onto the branch, over the blossom . Inside were twigs and leaves and two pears. Over the summer, the pears had grown and gotten sweet inside the bottle. When the pears were ripe, Virginia would pull the bottle off the tree with the pears inside. She would then fill the bottle with pear nectar and give it to her sister Caroline, who would never guess how Virginia managed to put those pears inside this glass bottle. Alex then goes on to try to help Jake load everything else back to the house, and once again, Jake brushes Alex off. As Jake starts to unload the wood, Alex spots a wolf spider on his neck. Alex starts to talk to Jake about it but Jake thinks they are talking about Virginia who is right outside the window by the pear tree. After having a long conversation about it, Alex lets Jake know that is a wolf spider that they are talking about. Jake panics and asks Alex for help as he starts to search every piece of clothing. Jake is then standing in the porch naked with just his cowboy hat on hand. Virginia comes over and Alex tries to explain the situation to her. She points out to the hat is where the spider had been the whole time. Jake then picks Alex up and starts dancing with joy. Virginia starts feeling the twins dancing in her belly as well as she sees Jake and Alex do the same.

== Characters ==
Alex - A young boy living with his mother and stepfather

Jake - Jake is Alex's stepfather

Virginia - Alex's mother, who is expecting twins

Caroline- Caroline is Virginia's sister

== Critical reception ==
Like Jake and Me has been highly recommended for parents and children undergoing difficult step-parent relationships. Nancy B. Cardozo of The New York Times Book Review states, "Like Jake and Me has much wisdom to offer children (and parents) who are in situations similar to young Alex." David Gale of School Library Journal states, "This is an uplifting celebration of new family's understanding, acceptance and love that resonates with truth and humor." Other critics found that the illustrations brought the book to life. Ethel Twichell of The Horn Book Magazine comments "Bold, painterly illustrations, barely containing the strong personalities of their subjects, vigorously bring to life the mutual adjustment of young Alex and his stepfather, Jake. . . ." Nancy B. Cardozo of The New York Times also says, "The writing is lyrical and accurate, with colorful descriptions of the landscape. Lloyd Bloom's soft-edged illustrations use an autumnal palette complete with the subdued reds, yellows, oranges, and pinks of fall foliage. While some may find them overblown, others will enjoy the ethereal look they lend to this story."

== Awards ==
- Newbery Medal Honor Book in 1985
