= Robert H. Hudson =

American artist (1938–2024)

Robert Hudson
- After Wood, painted steel, 1990, Smithsonian American Art Museum
- Born: Robert H. Hudson; September 8, 1938; Salt Lake City, Utah, U.S.
- Died: June 14, 2024 (aged 85)
- Education: San Francisco Art Institute
- Known for: Sculpture
- Movement: Modernist sculpture, Geometric abstraction
- Spouse(s): Cornelia Schulz (m. 1962–?; divorced); Mavis Jukes (m. 1977–present)
- Children: 4
- Website: roberthudsonart.com

Robert H. Hudson (born September 8, 1938 – June 14, 2024) was an American visual artist. He is known for his funk art assemblage of metal sculptures, but he has also worked in painting and printmaking.

Hudson lived and worked in Cotati, Sonoma County, California.

== Early life and education ==
Robert Hudson was born in 1938 in Salt Lake City, Utah and he grew up in Richland, Washington. At a young age he became interested in making art.

Hudson moved to San Francisco, California, in 1957 to attend College. He received a B.F.A degree in 1961 and an M.F.A. degree in 1963, both from the California School of Fine Arts (now San Francisco Art Institute or SFAI). Hudson was a classmate of William T. Wiley. Hudson studied under Nathan Oliveira, Frank Lobdell, Elmer Bischoff, Jeremy Anderson, Gurdon Woods, and Frank Hamilton.

== Career ==
Hudson is known for his funk art assemblages, from the late 1950s and 1960s. He has also produced non-objective paintings, ceramics and large steel and bronze sculptures. His first solo exhibition was in 1961 at the Richmond Art Center, while he was still in graduate school.

In 2010, Hudson created a 16-story tall mural made of polychromatic enameled steel panels for One Hawthorne, a condominium building in San Francisco.

== Personal life ==
He was married in 1962 to artist Cornelia Schulz, whom he met at SFAI. Through his marriage to Schultz, they had two sons, and it eventually ended in divorce. His son Case Hudson (born 1968) is a master printmaker and has worked at Crown Point Press, and Gemini G.E.L.

Hudson's second marriage was to author Mavis Jukes in 1977, and they have two daughters together. Hudson died on June 14, 2024, at the age of 85.

== Public collections ==
Tlingit (1980) by Robert Hudson, located in the atrium lobby of the interior of the Federal Building and U.S. Courthouse, Anchorage, Alaska. This sculpture is composed of painted aluminum, and stands 17' 10" x 11' 6" x 5' 10" in size.

Several public museum collections hold work by Hudson, they are:

- Addison Gallery of American Art, Andover, Massachusetts,
- Albright-Knox Art Gallery, Buffalo, New York,
- Art Institute of Chicago, Chicago, Illinois,
- Di Rosa Collection, Napa, California,
- Fine Arts Museums of San Francisco (FAMSF), San Francisco, California,
- National Gallery of Art, Washington, D.C.,
- Crocker Art Museum, Sacramento, California,
- Henry Art Gallery, University of Washington, Seattle, Washington,
- Hirshhorn Museum and Sculpture Garden, Washington, D.C.,
- Honolulu Museum of Art, Honolulu, Hawaii,
- Los Angeles County Museum of Art, Los Angeles, California,
- Museum of Fine Arts, Boston, Boston, Massachusetts,
- Museum of Modern Art, New York City, New York,
- Museum of Sonoma County, Santa Rosa, California,
- Oakland Museum of California, Oakland, California,
- Palm Springs Desert Museum, Palm Springs, California,
- Philadelphia Museum of Art, Philadelphia, Pennsylvania,
- Saint Louis Art Museum, Saint Louis, Missouri,
- San Francisco Museum of Modern Art, San Francisco, California,
- Smithsonian American Art Museum, Washington, D.C.,
- Stedelijk Museum, Amsterdam, the Netherlands,
- Utah Museum of Fine Arts, Salt Lake City, Utah,
- Whitney Museum of American Art, New York City, New York
