= Julius Marmur =

American molecular biologist

Julius Marmur (March 22, 1926 – May 20, 1996) was an American molecular biologist who made significant contributions to DNA research. His discovery, while working in the laboratory of Paul Doty at Harvard University, that the denaturation of DNA was reversible (DNA hybridization) and depended on salt- and GC-content, had a major impact on how scientists thought about DNA, and how DNA could be handled in vitro. This discovery was a cornerstone of the recombinant DNA revolution.

DNA strand recombination was observed using bacterial DNA; monitoring absorbance-temperature curves, density-gradient ultracentrifugation and by direct inspection using electron microscopy. Further evidence of reversible hybridization was given by experiments measuring the ability of heat-treated DNA to transform bacterial strains.

Marmur was born in Białystok, Poland, grew up in Canada and graduated from McGill University in 1946. He received a master's degree from McGill and a PhD in bacterial physiology from Iowa State University.

Marmur spent most of his professional career at Albert Einstein College of Medicine in the Bronx, New York, affiliated with Yeshiva University. Honoring the memory of Dr. Marmur, the college holds an annual Julius Marmur Symposium acknowledging excellence in graduate student research.
