= Emil L. Smith =

American biochemist

- Born: July 5, 1911
- Died: May 31, 2009 (aged 97)
- Education: Columbia University, Ph.D. in biophysics (1936).
- Known for: Sequence of cytochrome c
- Awards: Stein-Moore Award of The Protein Society.
- Scientific career
- Fields: Biochemistry, protein chemistry
- Institutions: Cambridge University, Yale University, Rockefeller University, University of Utah, UCLA
- Academic advisors: David Keilin, Selig Hecht

Emil L. Smith (July 5, 1911 – May 31, 2009) was an American biochemist who studied protein structure and function as well as biochemical evolution.

Initially intending to go into medicine, Smith became interested in biology and organic chemistry during his second year at Columbia University. He earned a B.S. in 1931 and stayed at Columbia to study photosynthesis under Selig Hecht, completing a Ph.D. in biophysics in 1936. In 1938, he went to Cambridge University on a Guggenheim Fellowship to work with David Keilin on the chlorophyll-protein complex. Upon returning to the U.S. during World War II, he took a position at Yale University's Connecticut Agricultural Experiment Station to work with Hubert Bradford Vickery. He joined the lab of eminent protein chemist Max Bergmann at the Rockefeller Institute in 1940, where he worked with a number of important biochemists and began a significant line of research on the intestinal enzyme erepsin.

Between 1942 and 1946, he worked at E. R. Squibb & Sons on the production of human blood products for use in the war. In 1946 he became an associate professor (and ultimately full professor) at the University of Utah. In 1958, Emanuel Margoliash joined his lab and they began working on the peptide sequence of the protein cytochrome c; based on comparisons between cytochrome c from different species, Smith and Margoliash performed some of the earliest work in the field of molecular evolution, applying the idea of the molecular clock to the highly conserved cytochrome c sequence. In 1969, he worked with James Bonner to sequence histone H4 in several species, which was also of significant use in evolutionary studies.

In 1963, he moved to UCLA as professor and chair of the department of biological chemistry in the school of medicine, and became an emeritus professor in 1979.

He was elected to the National Academy of Sciences in 1962, the American Academy of Arts and Sciences in 1962, and the American Philosophical Society in 1973. In 1987, Smith won the Stein-Moore Award of The Protein Society.

== Sources ==
- "Smith, Emil L." American Men & Women of Science. Katherine H. Nemeh, ed. 25th ed. 8 vols. Gale, 2008.
- "Emil L. Smith." Marquis Who's Who. Marquis Who's Who, 2008.
- Kresge, Nicole; Robert D. Simoni; Robert L. Hill (2004-11-19). "The Characterization of Intestinal Peptidases by Emil L. Smith". Journal of Biological Chemistry. 279 (47): e6. doi:10.1016/S0021-9258(19)32354-3.
