= Thomas H. Jukes =

British-American biologist (1906–1999)

- Born: Thomas Hughes Jukes; August 26, 1906; Hastings, England
- Died: November 1, 1999 (aged 93)
- Education: University of Toronto (Ph.D. 1933)
- Known for: Nutrition, molecular evolution
- Spouse: Marguerite
- Children: 3, including Mavis Jukes
- Scientific career
- Institutions: University of California, Berkeley, University of California, Davis, American Cyanamid's Lederle Laboratories

Thomas Hughes Jukes (August 26, 1906 – November 1, 1999) was a British-born American biologist known for his work in nutrition, molecular evolution, and for his public engagement with controversial scientific issues, including DDT, vitamin C and creationism. He was the co-author, with Jack Lester King, of the 1969 Science article "Non-Darwinian Evolution" which, along with Motoo Kimura's earlier publication, was the origin of the neutral theory of molecular evolution.

== Biography ==
Jukes was born in Hastings, England, but moved to Toronto in 1924. In 1933, he earned a Ph.D. in biochemistry from the University of Toronto. He spent the next decade in the University of California system, first as a postdoctoral fellow at UC Berkeley, then as Instructor and assistant professor at UC Davis. At Davis, he helped determine the relationships among the B complex vitamins through experiments on chickens. He then left academia to work for American Cyanamid's Lederle Laboratories, where he helped established that folic acid is a vitamin and discovered that feeding livestock a continual supply of antibiotics significantly enhances growth (a practice that has become widespread in the meat industry).

Following the rise of molecular biology, Jukes returned to UC Berkeley, where he spent the rest of his career. Independently of Motoo Kimura, Jukes (with Jack King) proposed in 1969 that the evolution of proteins is primarily driven by genetic drift acting on mutations that are neither beneficial nor deleterious—the neutral theory of molecular evolution. Despite the provocative paper ("Non-Darwinian Evolution"), he was not a prominent participant in the ensuing "neutralist-selectionist debate"; defense of the neutral theory was primarily left to others, especially Kimura. In 1971, Jukes was one of the founders of the Journal of Molecular Evolution; his subsequent work with molecular evolution focused especially on the origin and evolution of the genetic code.

After returning to Berkeley, he also became heavily involved in a number of public scientific controversies, and was a gifted polemicist. In the 1960s, he fought against the introduction of creationism into the California public schools. Following the rise of the environmental movement, he fought against DDT bans, citing lack of evidence for detrimental effects to ecosystems. Between 1975 and 1980 he was one of the only scientists ever to have a regular column in the journal Nature, which he used to denounce a variety of what he considered pseudoscience, expressing "his deep suspicion that categorical statements of scientific 'fact' are usually exaggerations." He was one of the most prominent critics of Linus Pauling's claims about the benefits of vitamin C megadosage, and a frequent critic of other nutrition-based health and treatment claims, such as for homeopathy and the supposed cancer cure Laetrile.

Thomas Jukes died of pneumonia on November 1, 1999. At the time of his death, he had a wife named Marguerite, along with two daughters (one of whom was the author Mavis Jukes), one daughter-in-law, and seven grandchildren.
