= Paul M. Doty =

American professor of Biochemistry (1920–2011)

Paul Mead Doty (June 1, 1920 – December 5, 2011) was Mallinckrodt Professor of Biochemistry at Harvard University, specializing in the physical properties of macromolecules and strongly involved in peace and security policy issues.

== Biography ==
Doty was born in Charleston, West Virginia. He graduated from Penn State University in 1941 and took his doctorate from Columbia University under Joseph Edward Mayer. From 1943–1945, he was at the Polytechnic Institute of Brooklyn. He joined the chemistry department Harvard University in 1948, became a member of the American Academy of Arts and Sciences in 1951, and became a member of the National Academy of Sciences in 1957. In 1954, he helped to recruit James Watson to the Harvard Biolabs, the home of the biology department, as an assistant professor.

In 1960, while working in Doty's lab, Julius Marmur discovered the reversible hybridization of DNA. Doty later helped to found the Department of Biochemistry and Molecular Biology and became its first chairman in 1968. His scientific work involved the characterization of biopolymers such as DNA, proteins and collagen by optical methods such as circular dichroism and light scattering. In his 42 years at Harvard, he supervised the research of 66 undergraduate and graduate students, and 85 postdoctoral fellows; many of his trainees later became leaders in their fields, and at least 11 were elected to the National Academy of Sciences.

As a graduate student, he worked on the Manhattan Project, which led to his lifelong involvement in activities aiming to avert nuclear war. He was a special assistant to the president for national security and member of the President's Science and Arms Control Advisory Committees and in 1973 was a founder and director emeritus of the Belfer Center for Science and International Affairs at Harvard.

He was a member of the board of the Bulletin of the Atomic Scientists. He was involved for many years in the Pugwash Conferences. He was also a member of the American Philosophical Society. After retirement he continued to work on Russian-American scientific relations and was board member of George Soros' International Science Foundation that provided support to Russian scientists in the 1990s.

== Awards ==
- 1956 ACS Award in Pure Chemistry
