= Emile Zuckerkandl =

Austrian-French biologist (1922–2013)

Émile Zuckerkandl
- Born: 4 July 1922; Vienna, Austria
- Died: 9 November 2013 (aged 91); Palo Alto, California
- Known for: Molecular clock
- Scientific career
- Fields: Molecular Biology

Émile Zuckerkandl (July 4, 1922 – November 9, 2013) was an Austrian-born French biologist considered one of the founders of the field of molecular evolution. He introduced, with Linus Pauling, the concept of the "molecular clock", which enabled the neutral theory of molecular evolution.

== Life and work ==
Zuckerkandl was raised in Vienna, Austria in a household of intellectuals, but his family relocated in 1938 to Paris, and later Algiers, to escape the racial policy of Nazi Germany with respect to Jews. At the end of World War II, he spent one year at the University of Paris (Sorbonne), then came to the United States to study physiology—earning a master's degree in 1947 from the University of Illinois, under C. Ladd Prosser—then returned to the Sorbonne to complete a Ph.D. in biology. Zuckerkandl developed a strong interest in molecular problems; his early research at a marine biology lab in Roscoff emphasized the roles of copper oxidases and hemocyanin in the molting cycles of crabs. In 1957, Zuckerkandl met renowned chemist Linus Pauling, who was becoming interested in molecular diseases and molecular evolution as an outgrowth of his activism on topics concerning nuclear power. They arranged a post-doctoral fellowship, and Zuckerkandl (now with his wife Jane, daughter of geneticist Charles W. Metz) returned to the United States to work with Pauling at the California Institute of Technology beginning in 1959. He was an atheist.

=== Linus Pauling and the molecular clock hypothesis ===
Zuckerkandl's first project under Pauling (working with graduate student Richard T. Jones) was the application of new protein identification techniques—a combination of paper chromatography and electrophoresis that produced a two-dimensional pattern—to hemoglobin. The peptide fragments of hemoglobin samples from different species, partially broken apart by digestive enzymes, would produce unique patterns that could be used to estimate differences of protein structure. Zuckerkandl, Jones and Pauling published a comparison of several species' hemoglobin identification patterns in 1960, observing that the degree of dissimilarity of protein patterns corresponded approximately to the phylogenetic distance between source species. However, the method was not conducive to quantitative comparisons, so Zuckerkandl began working on the determination of the actual peptide sequence of the α and β chains of human and gorilla hemoglobin.

In 1962, Pauling and Zuckerkandl published their first paper using the molecular clock concept (though not yet by that name). Like a number subsequent collaborative papers, it was not peer-reviewed—it was an invited paper in honor of Albert Szent-Györgyi—and they intentionally took the opportunity to "say something outrageous". The paper used the number of differences in the α and β chains of hemoglobin to infer the time since the last common ancestor for a number of species, calibrated based on paleontological evidence for humans and horses. Though the paper did not provide any explanation for why amino acid differences in a protein should accumulate at a uniform rate (the essential assumption of the molecular clock), it did show that the results were fairly consistent with those of paleontologists.

During the succeeding years, Zuckerkandl worked to refine the molecular clock. In 1963, he and Pauling invented the term "semantides" for biological sequences—DNA, RNA, and polypeptides—that have evolutionary information and argued that such sequences could be the basis for constructing molecular phylogenies, suggesting that the "molecular clock" method might be useful for other semantides besides proteins. Emanuel Margoliash's first publication of sequence data for cytochrome c allowed comparison of the rates of molecular evolution for different proteins (cytochrome c seemed to evolve faster than hemoglobin), which Zuckerkandl discussed at a 1964 conference in Bruges. Zuckerkandl also adjusted the mathematics of the "clock" to account for the observation that some positions in an amino acid sequence were more stable than others, and the likelihood of multiple substitutions at the same position. In September 1964, he attended the important Evolving Genes and Proteins symposium, where he and Pauling presented their most influential paper ("Evolutionary Divergence and Convergence in Proteins", published in the conference proceedings the next year). The paper, primarily Zuckerkandl's work, named the "evolutionary clock" and presented a derivation of its basic mathematical form. Though Zuckerkandl and Pauling saw the clock as compatible with natural selection, it would later become the basis of the neutral theory of molecular evolution, in which genetic drift rather than selection is the driving force of evolution at the molecular level.

=== Later work ===
In 1965, Zuckerkandl moved back to France to direct in Montpellier, the "Centre de Recherche de Biochimie Macromoléculaire" of the Centre National de Recherche Scientifique. In 1971, he became the founding editor of the Journal of Molecular Evolution, and in the late 1970s became President of the Linus Pauling Institute (then in 1992 of its successor, the Institute of Molecular Medical Sciences). His recent work includes criticism of social constructionism and intelligent design.
