= Journal of Molecular Evolution =

- Discipline: Molecular evolution
- Language: English
- Edited by: David Liberles

Publication details
- History: 1971-present
- Publisher: Springer Science+Business Media
- Frequency: Monthly
- Impact factor: 3.973 (2022)

Standard abbreviations
- ISO 4: J. Mol. Evol.

Indexing
- CODEN: JMEVAU
- ISSN: 0022-2844 (print); 1432-1432 (web)
- LCCN: 72626641
- OCLC no.: 01784021

Links
- Journal homepage; Online archive

The Journal of Molecular Evolution is a monthly peer-reviewed scientific journal that covers molecular evolution. It is published by Springer Science+Business Media and was established in 1971. The founding editor was Emile Zuckerkandl, who remained editor-in-chief until the late 1990s. In 1994, the journal became associated with the then existent International Society of Molecular Evolution.

== Scope ==
In a 1998 editorial, Zuckerkandl stated that he wanted the journal to "insure that this field be covered in its broadest sense" by publishing research that is of broad interest to the field of molecular evolution that it helped define, as well as to biology in general. To this end, Zuckerkandl stated that the journal does not cover research either on practical applications of molecular evolution, or articles "whose focus is very restricted and that do not lead to valuable insights beyond their narrow topic". However, he looked forward to coverage of new, rapidly developing areas of molecular evolution such as molecular developmental biology and work connecting molecular evolution to higher levels of biological organization.

In 1999, under the new joint editorship of Martin Kreitman, Takashi Gojobori, and Giorgio Bernardi, the journal made explicit its focus on "the fundamental issues in molecular evolution", to the exclusion of molecular phylogenetics (the purview of several other molecular evolution journals, most significantly Molecular Phylogenetics and Evolution), except in cases that have "a special significance and impact".

An editorial by Niles Lehman, editor-in-chief at the time, in 2013 stated a refocus of the journal's aims towards its original scope with the inclusion of an emphasis on the mechanisms of evolution. "Studies performed using computational, chemical, in vitro, and experimental evolutionary methods, and those that target species-independent phenomena such as ribosomal function, genetic code evolution, and regulatory processes will occupy more of the journal space than before, with the consequence that work that is organism-, lineage-, or gene-specific will require a broader impact to be considered for publication."

== Zuckerkandl Prize ==
In 2001, the publisher established the yearly Zuckerkandl Prize for the best paper from the journal, in honor of Emile Zuckerkandl.
