= Emanuel Margoliash =

American biochemist (1920–2008)

- Born: February 10, 1920; Cairo, Egypt
- Died: April 10, 2008 (aged 88); Chicago, Illinois
- Education: American University of Beirut (M.D.)
- Known for: Fitch-Margoliash method for constructing evolutionary trees
- Scientific career
- Fields: Biochemistry
- Workplaces: Hebrew University of Jerusalem, Nobel Institute, University of Utah, McGill-Montreal General Hospital Research Institute, Abbott Laboratories, Northwestern University, University of Illinois

Emanuel Margoliash (February 10, 1920 – April 10, 2008) was a biochemist who spent much of his career studying the protein cytochrome c. He is best known for his work on molecular evolution; with Walter Fitch, he devised the Fitch-Margoliash method for constructing evolutionary trees based on protein sequences.

He was a member of the United States National Academy of Sciences, National Academy of Sciences and the American Academy of Arts and Sciences.

== Biography ==
Margoliash was born in Cairo in 1920. He earned an M.D. from the American University of Beirut. He served as an Israeli Army medical officer during the 1948 Arab-Israeli War, and subsequently held research positions at the Hebrew University of Jerusalem-Hadassah Medical School, the Nobel Institute Department of Biochemistry, the University of Utah College of Medicine, the McGill-Montreal General Hospital Research Institute, Abbott Laboratories, Northwestern University, where he was chair of the Department of Biochemistry, Molecular Biology and Cell Biology during the 1980s. He left Abbott Laboratories to join the faculty at Northwestern University, and continued his research on cytochrome c, until Northwestern University's policies forced him to retire. He quietly enjoyed his retirement ceremonies and immediately obtained a position (with all new labs) at the University of Illinois at Chicago.

Margoliash's passion for cytochrome C research took him all over the world, and in 1970 he was offered the chance to dissect a coelacanth fish and isolate its cytochrome C for sequencing. This fish which lives at great ocean depths was washed up on the shores of the Comoros during the war, and de Gaulle deemed it a "French fish" and refused to allow its exportation. Margoliash went to France and with his colleagues carried out the cytochrome C isolation of the large fish, and returned with a small crystal in a small vial which represented the entire amount of cytochrome C in the unusual animal.

He died in Chicago in 2008 at the age of 88.
