= Molecular evolution =

Study of changes in DNA and RNA over time

Molecular evolution describes how inherited DNA and/or RNA change over evolutionary time, and the consequences of this for proteins and other components of cells and organisms. Molecular evolution is the basis of phylogenetic approaches to describing the tree of life. Molecular evolution overlaps with population genetics, especially on shorter timescales. Topics in molecular evolution include the origins of new genes, the genetic nature of complex traits, the genetic basis of adaptation and speciation, the evolution of development, and patterns and processes underlying genomic changes during evolution.

== History ==
The history of molecular evolution starts in the early 20th century with comparative biochemistry, and the use of "fingerprinting" methods such as immune assays, gel electrophoresis, and paper chromatography in the 1950s to explore homologous proteins. The advent of protein sequencing allowed molecular biologists to create phylogenies based on sequence comparison, and to use the differences between homologous sequences as a molecular clock to estimate the time since the most recent common ancestor. The surprisingly large amount of molecular divergence within and between species inspired the neutral theory of molecular evolution in the late 1960s. Neutral theory also provided a theoretical basis for the molecular clock, although this is not needed for the clock's validity. After the 1970s, nucleic acid sequencing allowed molecular evolution to reach beyond proteins to highly conserved ribosomal RNA sequences, the foundation of a reconceptualization of the early history of life. The Society for Molecular Biology and Evolution was founded in 1982.

== Molecular phylogenetics ==
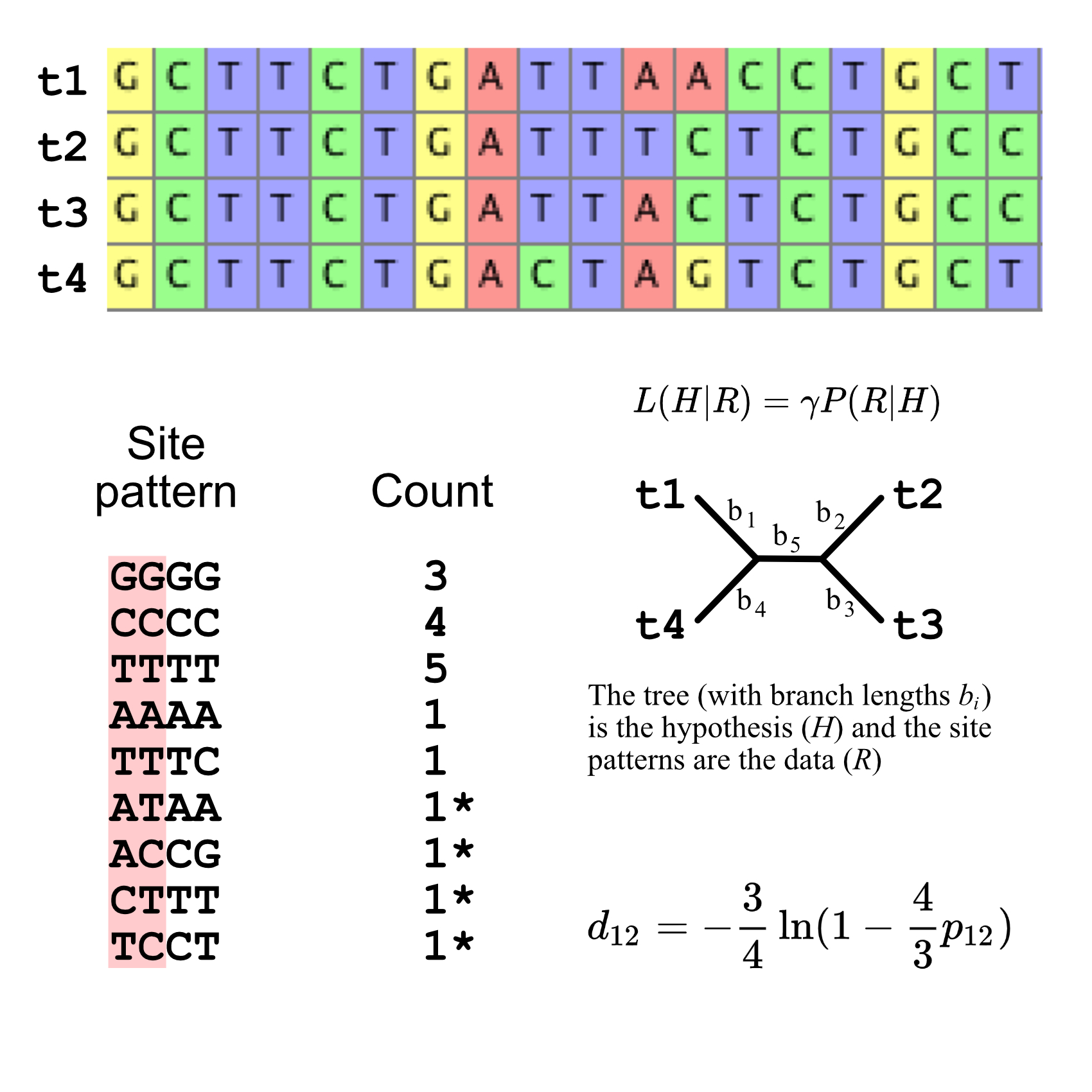
Multiple sequence alignment (in this case DNA sequences) and illustrations of the use of substitution models to make evolutionary inferences. The data in this alignment (in this case a toy example with 18 sites) is converted to a set of site patterns. The site patterns are shown along with the number of times they occur in alignment. These site patterns are used to calculate the likelihood given the substitution model and a phylogenetic tree (in this case an unrooted four-taxon tree). It is also necessary to assume a substitution model to estimate evolutionary distances for pairs of sequences (distances are the number of substitutions that have occurred since sequences had a common ancestor). The evolutionary distance equation (d_{12}) is based on the simple model proposed by Jukes and Cantor in 1969. The equation transforms the proportion of nucleotide differences between taxa 1 and 2 (p_{12} = 4/18; the four site patterns that differ between taxa 1 and 2 are indicated with asterisks) into an evolutionary distance (in this case d_{12}=0.2635 substitutions per site).

Molecular phylogenetics uses DNA, RNA, or protein sequences to resolve questions in systematics, i.e. about their correct scientific classification from the point of view of evolutionary history. The result of a molecular phylogenetic analysis is expressed in a phylogenetic tree. Phylogenetic inference is conducted using data from DNA sequencing. This is aligned to identify which sites are homologous. A substitution model describes what patterns are expected to be common or rare. Sophisticated computational inference is then used to generate one or more plausible trees.

Some phylogenetic methods account for variation among sites and among tree branches. Different genes, e.g. hemoglobin vs. cytochrome c, generally evolve at different rates. These rates are relatively constant over time (e.g., hemoglobin does not evolve at the same rate as cytochrome c, but hemoglobins from humans, mice, etc. do have comparable rates of evolution), although rapid evolution along one branch can indicate increased directional selection on that branch. Purifying selection causes functionally important regions to evolve more slowly, and amino acid substitutions involving similar amino acids occurs more often than dissimilar substitutions.

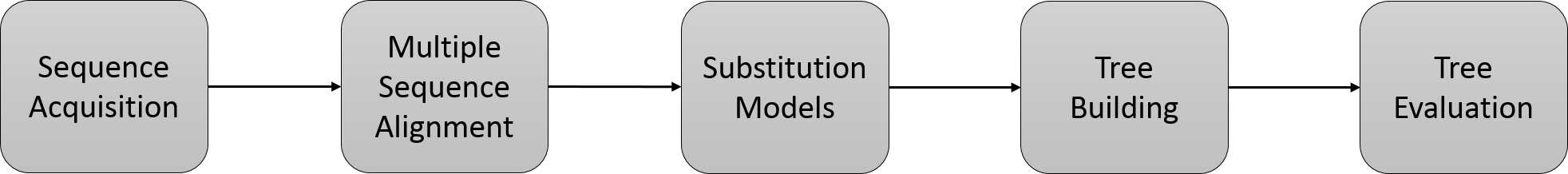
Five Stages of Molecular Phylogenetic Analysis

== Gene family evolution ==
Gene phylogeny as lines within grey species phylogeny. Top: An ancestral gene duplication produces two paralogs (histone H1.1 and 1.2). A speciation event produces orthologs in the two daughter species (human and chimpanzee). Bottom: in a separate species (E. coli), a gene has a similar function (histone-like nucleoid-structuring protein) but has a separate evolutionary origin and so is an analog.

Gene duplication can produce multiple homologous proteins (paralogs) within the same species. Phylogenetic analysis of proteins has revealed how proteins evolve and change their structure and function over time.

For example, ribonucleotide reductase (RNR) has evolved a multitude of structural and functional variants. Class I RNRs use a ferritin subunit and differ by the metal they use as cofactors. In class II RNRs, the thiyl radical is generated using an adenosylcobalamin cofactor and these enzymes do not require additional subunits (as opposed to class I which do). In class III RNRs, the thiyl radical is generated using S-adenosylmethionine bound to a [4Fe-4S] cluster. That is, within a single family of proteins numerous structural and functional mechanisms can evolve.

In a proof-of-concept study, Bhattacharya and colleagues converted myoglobin, a non-enzymatic oxygen storage protein, into a highly efficient Kemp eliminase using only three mutations. This demonstrates that only few mutations are needed to radically change the function of a protein. Directed evolution is the attempt to engineer proteins using methods inspired by molecular evolution.

== Molecular evolution at one site ==
Change at one locus begins with a new mutation, which might become fixed due to some combination of natural selection, genetic drift, and gene conversion.

=== Mutation ===
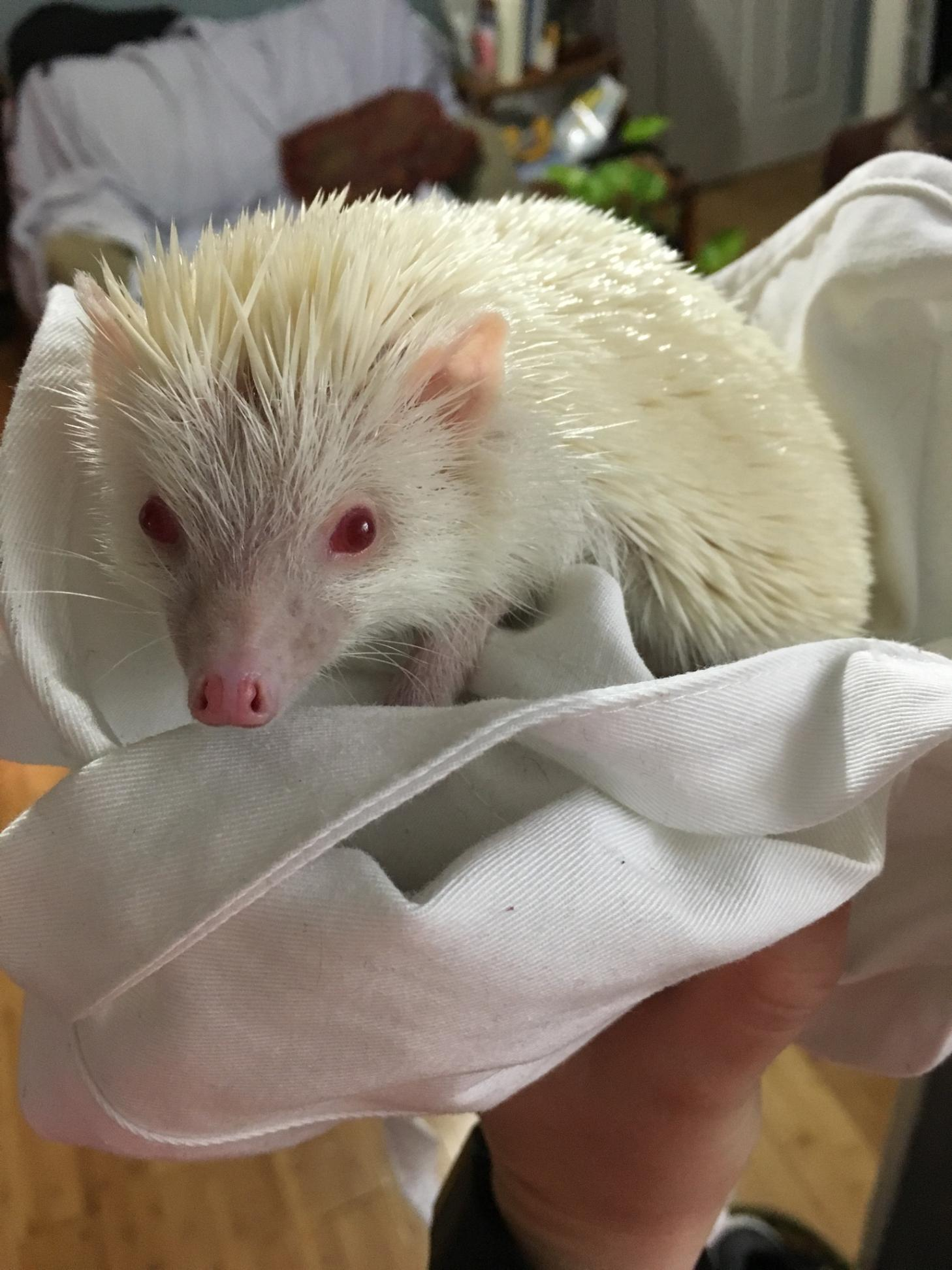
This hedgehog has no pigmentation due to a mutation.

Mutations are permanent, transmissible changes to the genetic material (DNA or RNA) of a cell or virus. Mutations result from errors in DNA replication during cell division and by exposure to radiation, chemicals, other environmental stressors, viruses, or transposable elements. When point mutations to just one base-pair of the DNA fall within a region coding for a protein, they are characterized by whether they are synonymous (do not change the amino acid sequence) or non-synonymous. Other types of mutations modify larger segments of DNA and can cause duplications, insertions, deletions, inversions, and translocations.

The distribution of rates for diverse kinds of mutations is called the "mutation spectrum" (see App. B of). Mutations of different types occur at widely varying rates. Point mutation rates for most organisms are very low, roughly 10^{−9} to 10^{−8} per site per generation, though some viruses have higher mutation rates on the order of 10^{−6} per site per generation. Transitions (A ↔ G or C ↔ T) are more common than transversions (purine (adenine or guanine)) ↔ pyrimidine (cytosine or thymine, or in RNA, uracil)). Perhaps the most common type of mutation in humans is a change in the length of a short tandem repeat (e.g., the CAG repeats underlying various disease-associated mutations). Such STR mutations may occur at rates on the order of 10^{−3} per generation.

Different frequencies of different types of mutations can play an important role in evolution via bias in the introduction of variation (arrival bias), contributing to parallelism, trends, and differences in the navigability of adaptive landscapes. Mutation bias makes systematic or predictable contributions to parallel evolution. Since the 1960s, genomic GC content has been thought to reflect mutational tendencies. Mutational biases also contribute to codon usage bias. Although such hypotheses are often associated with neutrality, recent theoretical and empirical results have established that mutational tendencies can influence both neutral and adaptive evolution via bias in the introduction of variation (arrival bias).

=== Selection ===
Selection can occur when an allele confers greater fitness, i.e. greater ability to survive or reproduce, on the average individual than carries it. A selectionist approach emphasizes e.g. that biases in codon usage are due at least in part to the ability of even weak selection to shape molecular evolution.

Selection can also operate at the gene level at the expense of organismal fitness, resulting in intragenomic conflict. This is because there can be a selective advantage for selfish genetic elements in spite of a host cost. Examples of such selfish elements include transposable elements, meiotic drivers, and selfish mitochondria.

Selection can be detected using the Ka/Ks ratio, the McDonald–Kreitman test. Rapid adaptive evolution is often found for genes involved in intragenomic conflict, sexual antagonistic coevolution, and the immune system.

=== Genetic drift ===
Genetic drift is the change of allele frequencies from one generation to the next due to stochastic effects of random sampling in finite populations. These effects can accumulate until a mutation becomes fixed in a population. For neutral mutations, the rate of fixation per generation is equal to the mutation rate per replication. A relatively constant mutation rate thus produces a constant rate of change per generation (molecular clock).

Slightly deleterious mutations with a selection coefficient less than a threshold value of 1 / the effective population size can also fix. Many genomic features have been ascribed to accumulation of nearly neutral detrimental mutations as a result of small effective population sizes. With a smaller effective population size, a larger variety of mutations will behave as if they are neutral due to inefficiency of selection.

=== Gene conversion ===
Gene conversion occurs during recombination, when nucleotide damage is repaired using an homologous genomic region as a template. It can be a biased process, i.e. one allele may have a higher probability of being the donor than the other in a gene conversion event. In particular, GC-biased gene conversion tends to increase the GC-content of genomes, particularly in regions with higher recombination rates. There is also evidence for GC bias in the mismatch repair process. It is thought that this may be an adaptation to the high rate of methyl-cytosine deamination which can lead to C→T transitions.

The dynamics of biased gene conversion resemble those of natural selection, in that a favored allele will tend to increase exponentially in frequency when rare.

== Genome architecture ==
=== Genome size ===
Genome size is influenced by the amount of repetitive DNA as well as number of genes in an organism. Some organisms, such as most bacteria, Drosophila, and Arabidopsis have particularly compact genomes with little repetitive content or non-coding DNA. Other organisms, like mammals or maize, have large amounts of repetitive DNA, long introns, and substantial spacing between genes. The C-value paradox refers to the lack of correlation between organism 'complexity' and genome size. Explanations for the so-called paradox are two-fold. First, repetitive genetic elements can comprise large portions of the genome for many organisms, thereby inflating DNA content of the haploid genome. Repetitive genetic elements are often descended from transposable elements.

Secondly, the number of genes is not necessarily indicative of the number of developmental stages or tissue types in an organism. An organism with few developmental stages or tissue types may have large numbers of genes that influence non-developmental phenotypes, inflating gene content relative to developmental gene families.

Neutral explanations for genome size suggest that when population sizes are small, many mutations become nearly neutral. Hence, in small populations repetitive content and other 'junk' DNA can accumulate without placing the organism at a competitive disadvantage. There is little evidence to suggest that genome size is under strong widespread selection in multicellular eukaryotes. Genome size, independent of gene content, correlates poorly with most physiological traits and many eukaryotes, including mammals, harbor very large amounts of repetitive DNA.

However, birds likely have experienced strong selection for reduced genome size, in response to changing energetic needs for flight. Birds, unlike humans, produce nucleated red blood cells, and larger nuclei lead to lower levels of oxygen transport. Bird metabolism is far higher than that of mammals, due largely to flight, and oxygen needs are high. Hence, most birds have small, compact genomes with few repetitive elements. Indirect evidence suggests that non-avian theropod dinosaur ancestors of modern birds also had reduced genome sizes, consistent with endothermy and high energetic needs for running speed. Many bacteria have also experienced selection for small genome size, as time of replication and energy consumption are so tightly correlated with fitness.

=== Chromosome number and organization ===
The ant Myrmecia pilosula has only a single pair of chromosomes whereas the Adders-tongue fern Ophioglossum reticulatum has up to 1260 chromosomes. The number of chromosomes in an organism's genome does not necessarily correlate with the amount of DNA in its genome. The genome-wide amount of recombination is directly controlled by the number of chromosomes, with one crossover per chromosome or per chromosome arm, depending on the species.

Changes in chromosome number can play a key role in speciation, as differing chromosome numbers can serve as a barrier to reproduction in hybrids. Human chromosome 2 was created from a fusion of two chimpanzee chromosomes and still contains central telomeres as well as a vestigial second centromere. Polyploidy, especially allopolyploidy, which occurs often in plants, can also result in reproductive incompatibilities with parental species. Agrodiatus blue butterflies have diverse chromosome numbers ranging from n=10 to n=134 and additionally have one of the highest rates of speciation identified to date.

Cilliate genomes house each gene in individual chromosomes.

=== Organelles ===
Animal cell showing organelles.

In addition to the nuclear genome, endosymbiont organelles contain their own genetic material. Mitochondrial and chloroplast DNA varies across taxa, but membrane-bound proteins, especially electron transport chain constituents are most often encoded in the organelle. Chloroplasts and mitochondria are maternally inherited in most species, as the organelles must pass through the egg. In a rare departure, some species of mussels are known to inherit mitochondria from father to son.

== Origins of new genes ==
New genes arise from several different genetic mechanisms including gene duplication, de novo gene birth, retrotransposition, chimeric gene formation, recruitment of non-coding sequence into an existing gene, and gene truncation.

Gene duplication initially leads to redundancy. However, duplicated gene sequences can mutate to develop new functions or specialize so that the new gene performs a subset of the original ancestral functions. Retrotransposition duplicates genes by copying mRNA to DNA and inserting it into the genome. Retrogenes generally insert into new genomic locations, lack introns, and sometimes develop new expression patterns and functions.

De novo gene birth can give rise to protein-coding genes and non-coding genes from previously non-functional DNA. For instance, Levine and colleagues reported the origin of five new genes in the D. melanogaster genome. Similar de novo origin of genes has also been shown in other organisms such as yeast, rice and humans. De novo genes may evolve from spurious transcripts that are already expressed at low levels.

== Constructive neutral evolution ==
Constructive neutral evolution (CNE) explains that complex systems can emerge and spread into a population through neutral transitions with the principles of excess capacity, presuppression, and ratcheting, and it has been applied in areas ranging from the origins of the spliceosome to the complex interdependence of microbial communities.

== Journals and societies ==
The Society for Molecular Biology and Evolution publishes the journals "Molecular Biology and Evolution" and "Genome Biology and Evolution" and holds an annual international meeting. Other journals dedicated to molecular evolution include Journal of Molecular Evolution and Molecular Phylogenetics and Evolution. Research in molecular evolution is also published in journals of genetics, molecular biology, genomics, systematics, and evolutionary biology.

== See also ==
- Evolution
- E. coli long-term evolution experiment
- Evolutionary physiology
- Genomic organization
- Genome evolution
- Heterotachy
- History of molecular evolution
- Horizontal gene transfer
- Human evolution
- Molecular clock
- Molecular paleontology
- Nearly neutral theory of molecular evolution
- Neutral theory of molecular evolution
- Nucleotide diversity
- Phylogenetic comparative methods
- Phylogenetics
- Population genetics
- Selection
