= Tomoko Ohta =

Japanese biologist

- 太田 朋子, Ōta Tomoko
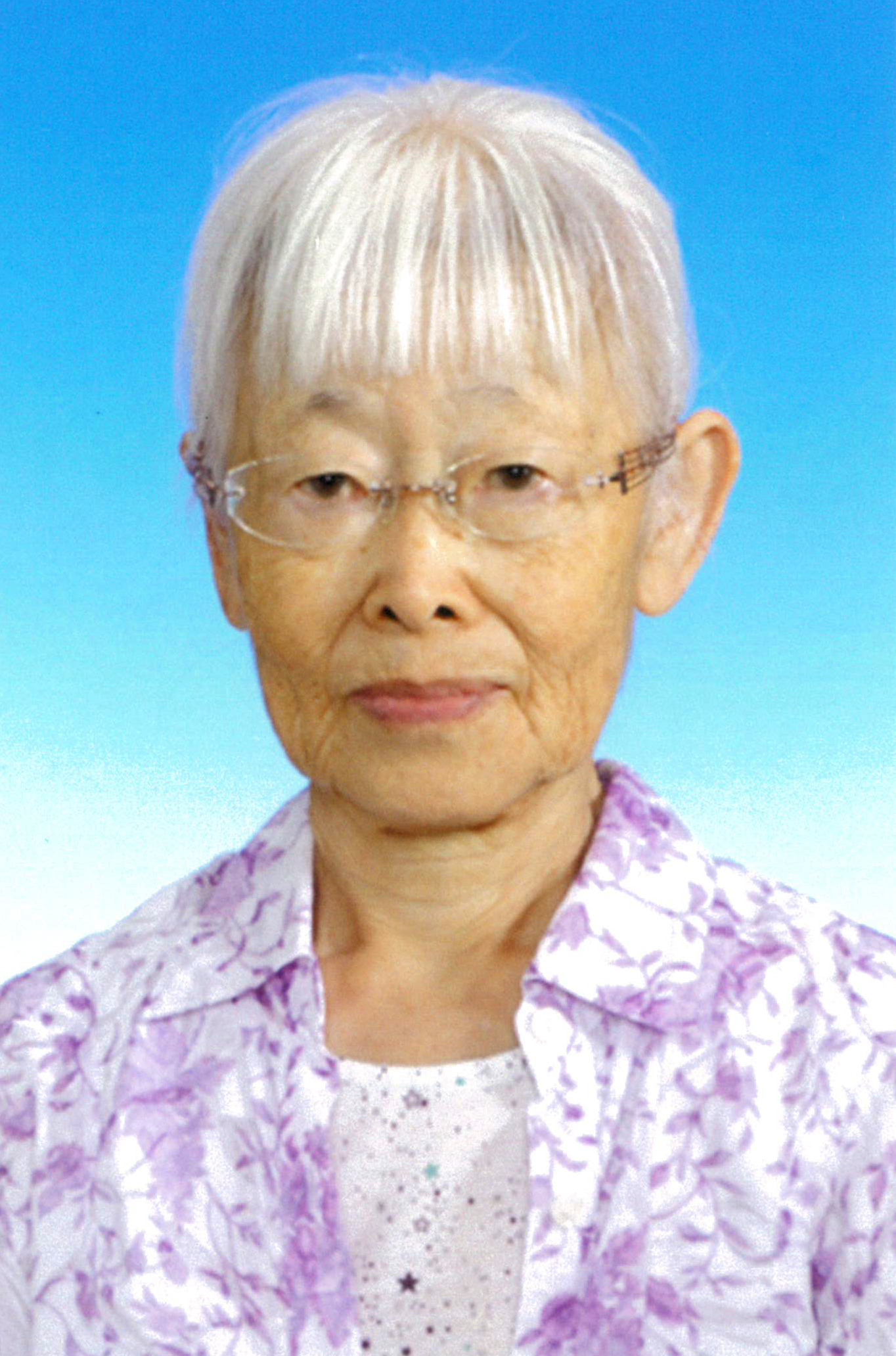
- Tomoko Ohta
- Born: 原田 朋子, Harada Tomoko; 7 September 1933 (age 92); Miyoshi, Japan
- Education: North Carolina State University; University of Tokyo
- Known for: Development of neutral theory of molecular evolution, and nearly neutral theory
- Spouse: Yasuo Ohta (m.1960-1972)
- Awards: Japan Academy Prize (1985); Weldon Memorial Prize (1986); Crafoord Prize (2015); Japan's Order of Culture (2016)
- Scientific career
- Fields: Evolutionary biology genetics
- Workplaces: National Institute of Genetics; North Carolina State University; Kihara Institute for Biological Research
- Doctoral advisor: Ken-Ichi Kojima
- Other academic advisors: Motoo Kimura; Hitoshi Kihara

Tomoko Ohta (太田 朋子, Ōta Tomoko; born Tomoko Harada 原田 朋子 7 September 1933, Miyoshi, Aichi) is a Japanese scientist and professor emeritus of the National Institute of Genetics. Ohta works on population genetics/molecular evolution and is known for developing the nearly neutral theory of evolution.

Ohta has received many awards, including Japan's Order of Culture (2016). In 2015, Ohta and Richard Lewontin were jointly awarded the Crafoord Prize "for their pioneering analyses and fundamental contributions to the understanding of genetic polymorphism".

== Education ==
Tomoko Ohta was born near Nagoya and grew up in Miyoshi-cho in Aichi Prefecture. She was in the 6th grade in elementary school when World War II ended. After the war, there were widespread changes in the social and educational systems, including the introduction of co-education. She attended junior high school in Toyota, and became interested in mathematics and physics. After senior high school, she entered Nagoya University. Having failed the examination for medical school, she transferred to the agriculture department at Tokyo University and majored in horticulture. Ohta graduated from the Agriculture Department of the University of Tokyo in 1956. After working at a publishing company, she was hired at the Kihara Institute for Biological Research. There she studied the cytogenetics of wheat and sugar beets.

Hitoshi Kihara gave Ohta an opportunity to study abroad, and in 1962, she entered the graduate program at North Carolina State University with support from a Fulbright scholarship. Having initially planned to work on plant cytogenetics, she switched her focus to population genetics. She worked with her advisor, Ken-Ichi Kojima, on problems in stochastic population genetics, Ohta completed her PhD in 1966.

== Career ==
Returning to Japan in 1967, Ohta obtained a post-doctoral position at Japan's National Institute of Genetics (NIG) under Motoo Kimura, then the only theoretical population geneticist in Japan. Ohta was later promoted to a research position at the National Institute of Genetics where she remained from 1969 to 1996. In April 1984, Ohta became a full professor in the Department of Population Genetics at NIG. She became head of the Department of Population Genetics at NIG in 1988, and served as the vice-director of the National Institute of Genetics from 1989 to 1991. Ohta served as vice-president of the Society for the Study of Evolution in 1994.

== Research ==
In the early 1960s, genetic theories about natural selection assumed that inherited mutations were either harmful, and would be removed from the population, or beneficial, and would be transmitted to future individuals in the population. Based on this assumption, all individuals in a population were expected to be highly similar. However, in 1966, Richard Lewontin and John Lee Hubby found a much greater than expected amount of genetic variation among the individuals in a population. Motoo Kimura proposed a possible explanation, the neutral theory of evolution, to model changes in a population over time. According to his theory, some gene variants were neither advantageous nor harmful and were not affected by natural selection.

Having worked on the neutral theory of evolution with Kimura, Ohta became convinced that division into good, neutral and harmful mutations was too simplistic a model to fully explain the observed data. She theorized that nearly neutral mutations (neither deleterious nor entirely neutral) still played an important role in evolution. She first developed the slightly deleterious model of molecular evolution, and then a more general form, the nearly neutral theory of evolution. Her theory challenged the position of her mentor Kimura, but they were able to debate fiercely and still maintain both their friendship and their independent positions.

Ohta's theory of slightly deleterious fixations introduced a new class of origin-fixation models, with the goal of better explaining observed data. While most of the mutations that affected encoded proteins were harmful, as long as they were not too significant ("nearly neutral"), they could remain in the population. Ohta also examined the role of chance and population size. She showed that population size is important in determining whether less-than-optimal variants can spread; in a smaller population, chance will have a greater effect on the set of outcomes, and natural selection will function more poorly. (In effect, rolling a small number of genetic dice is less likely to show a representative distribution of results than rolling a large number of dice.) As a result, mutations that are slightly deleterious can become more easily fixed in small than in large populations, through genetic drift. In 1974, Kimura and Ohta proposed a set of five general principles that might influence molecular evolution.

When Ohta first published her Nearly Neutral theory, she faced difficulty in attracting the scientific research community's attention and acceptance. Supporting data in protein evolution was sequentially collected in the 1990s, with even more evidence supporting her theory made available throughout the 21st century. There is more and more evidence evolving that supports her nearly neutral theory of evolution.

"The nearly neutral theory in its initial form may not explain all aspects of polymorphisms but, almost 50 years after it was first proposed by Tomoko Ohta (Ohta 1973), it still constitutes an excellent starting point for further theoretical developments."

== Recognition ==
Ohta's work in the field of molecular evolution has been recognized internationally.

- 1981 - Inaugural Saruhashi Prize, Society for the Bright Future of Women Scientists
- 1984 - International Honorary Member, American Academy of Arts and Sciences
- 1985 - Japan Academy Prize for "Theoretical Studies on Population Genetics at the Molecular Level"
- 1986 - Avon Special Prize for Women, Avon Japan
- 1986 - Weldon Memorial Prize, University of Oxford
- 2002 - Foreign Member of the United States National Academy of Sciences in evolutionary biology and genetics
- 2002 - Person of Cultural Merit, Emperor of Japan
- 2015 - Crafoord Prize of the Royal Swedish Academy of Sciences (shared with Richard Lewontin)
- 2016 - Order of Culture, Emperor of Japan
- 2018 - Society for Molecular Biology and Evolution (SMBE) Motoo Kimura Lifetime Contribution Award

== Bibliography (Works in English) ==
=== Books ===
- Kimura, Motoo; Ohta, Tomoko (1971). Theoretical aspects of population genetics. Princeton, NJ: Princeton Univ. Press. ISBN 9780691080987.
- Ōta, Tomoko (1980). Evolution and variation of multigene families. Berlin: Springer-Verlag. ISBN 978-3-540-09998-7.
- Ohta, Tomoko; Aoki, Kenichi, eds. (1985). Population genetics and molecular evolution: papers marking the sixtieth birthday of Motoo Kimura. Tokyo: Japan Scientific Societies Press. ISBN 978-0387155845.

=== Papers ===
- Kimura, M.; Ota, T. (1971). "On the rate of molecular evolution". Journal of Molecular Evolution. 1 (1): 1–17. Bibcode:1971JMolE...1....1K. doi:10.1007/BF01659390. ISSN 0022-2844. PMID 5173649. S2CID 30339157.
- Ota, T.; Kimura, M. (1971). "On the constancy of the evolutionary rate of cistrons". Journal of Molecular Evolution. 1 (1): 18–25. Bibcode:1971JMolE...1...18O. doi:10.1007/BF01659391. ISSN 0022-2844. PMID 4377445. S2CID 28498880.
- Kimura, M.; Ohta, T. (12 February 1971). "Protein polymorphism as a phase of molecular evolution". Nature. 229 (5285): 467–469. Bibcode:1971Natur.229..467K. doi:10.1038/229467a0. ISSN 0028-0836. PMID 4925204. S2CID 4290427.
- Ohta, Tomoko (November 1973). "Slightly Deleterious Mutant Substitutions in Evolution". Nature. 246 (5428): 96–98. Bibcode:1973Natur.246...96O. doi:10.1038/246096a0. ISSN 1476-4687. PMID 4585855. S2CID 4226804.
- Kimura, Motoo; Ohta, Tomoko (1 July 1974). "On Some Principles Governing Molecular Evolution". Proceedings of the National Academy of Sciences. 71 (7): 2848–2852. Bibcode:1974PNAS...71.2848K. doi:10.1073/pnas.71.7.2848. PMC 388569. PMID 4527913.
- Ohta, T. (1977). "Extension to the neutral mutation random drift hypothesis". In Kimura, M. (ed.). Molecular evolution, protein polymorphism and the neutral theory. Mishima: National Institute of Genetics. pp. 148–167.
- Ohta, T. (May 1982). "Linkage disequilibrium with the island model". Genetics. 101 (1): 139–155. doi:10.1093/genetics/101.1.139. ISSN 0016-6731. PMC 1201847. PMID 17246079.
- Ohta, T.; Tachida, H. (September 1990). "Theoretical Study of near Neutrality. I. Heterozygosity and Rate of Mutant Substitution". Genetics. 126 (1): 219–229. doi:10.1093/genetics/126.1.219. ISSN 0016-6731. PMC 1204126. PMID 2227381.
- Ohta, Tomoko (November 1992). "The Nearly Neutral Theory of Molecular Evolution". Annual Review of Ecology and Systematics. 23 (1): 263–286. Bibcode:1992AnRES..23..263O. doi:10.1146/annurev.es.23.110192.001403. ISSN 0066-4162.
- Ohta, Tomoko; Gillespie, John H. (April 1996). "Development of Neutral and Nearly Neutral Theories". Theoretical Population Biology. 49 (2): 128–142. Bibcode:1996TPBio..49..128O. doi:10.1006/tpbi.1996.0007. PMID 8813019.
- Ohta, Tomoko (10 December 2002). "Near-neutrality in evolution of genes and gene regulation". Proceedings of the National Academy of Sciences of the United States of America. 99 (25): 16134–16137. Bibcode:2002PNAS...9916134O. doi:10.1073/pnas.252626899. PMC 138577. PMID 12461171.
- Ohta, T. (2007). "Drift and Selection in Evolving Interacting Systems". In Bastolla, U.; Porto, M.; Roman, H. E.; Vendruscolo, M. (eds.). Structural Approaches to Sequence Evolution. Biological and Medical Physics, Biomedical Engineering. Berlin/Heidelberg: Springer. pp. 285–298. doi:10.1007/978-3-540-35306-5_13. ISBN 9783540353065.
- Ohta, Tomoko (2012), "Tomoko Ohta" (PDF), Current Biology, 22 (16): R618–R619, Bibcode:2012CBio...22.R618O, doi:10.1016/j.cub.2012.06.031, PMID 23082325
