= Ken-Ichi Kojima =

Japanese-American geneticist

- Born: September 17, 1930; Toyama, Japan
- Died: November 14, 1971 (aged 41); Near Austin, Texas
- Citizenship: American
- Known for: Frequency-dependent selection
- Spouse: Chizuko Kojima (m. 1955–1971)
- Scientific career
- Fields: Population genetics
- Thesis: An analysis of genetic systems in which the phenotype depends upon deviations from an optimum (1958)
- Doctoral advisor: C. Clark Cockerham
- Other academic advisors: Hitoshi Kihara; Richard Lewontin
- Doctoral students: John H. Gillespie; Tomoko Ohta

Ken-Ichi Kojima (September 17, 1930 – November 14, 1971) was a Japanese-American population geneticist.

== Career ==
Ken-ichi Kojima graduated from Kyoto University with a B.S. degree in 1953; he went on to attend graduate school there, where he studied plant genetics under the supervision of Hitoshi Kihara. In 1955, Kojima, then a Fulbright Fellow, moved to North Carolina State University (NCSU) in Raleigh, North Carolina, to begin studying for his Ph.D. in statistics and genetics. During this time, he was one of several major contributors to NCSU's Rockefeller Foundation-funded Quantitative Genetics Program. He received his Ph.D. from North Carolina State University in 1958, where he was a graduate student of Ralph E. Comstock, Columbus Clark Cockerham, and Richard Lewontin. He was the first Japanese doctoral student to graduate North Carolina State University.

While at NCSU, Kojima was an assistant statistician in the Institute of Statistics from 1957 to 1958, and an assistant geneticist in the Department of Genetics from 1958 to 1959. In 1959, he was appointed assistant professor in NCSU's Department of Genetics, where he was promoted to associate professor in 1961 and to full professor in 1964. In 1967, he joined the University of Texas at Austin as Professor in the Department of Zoology. There, he and his colleagues conducted extensive research on frequency-dependent selection of enzyme loci, as well as the evolutionary fitness of the esterase-6 system, in Drosophila flies.

== Personal life ==
Kojima was born on September 17, 1930, in Toyama, Japan, to Seiji and Masako Kojima. He married Chizuko Yoshimura on May 1, 1955, in Japan. They had two children – a son, Kenji, and a daughter, Chiye. At the age of 41, Kojima died in a highway automobile accident near Austin, Texas, on November 14, 1971.
