= Takashi Gojobori =

Japanese molecular biologist

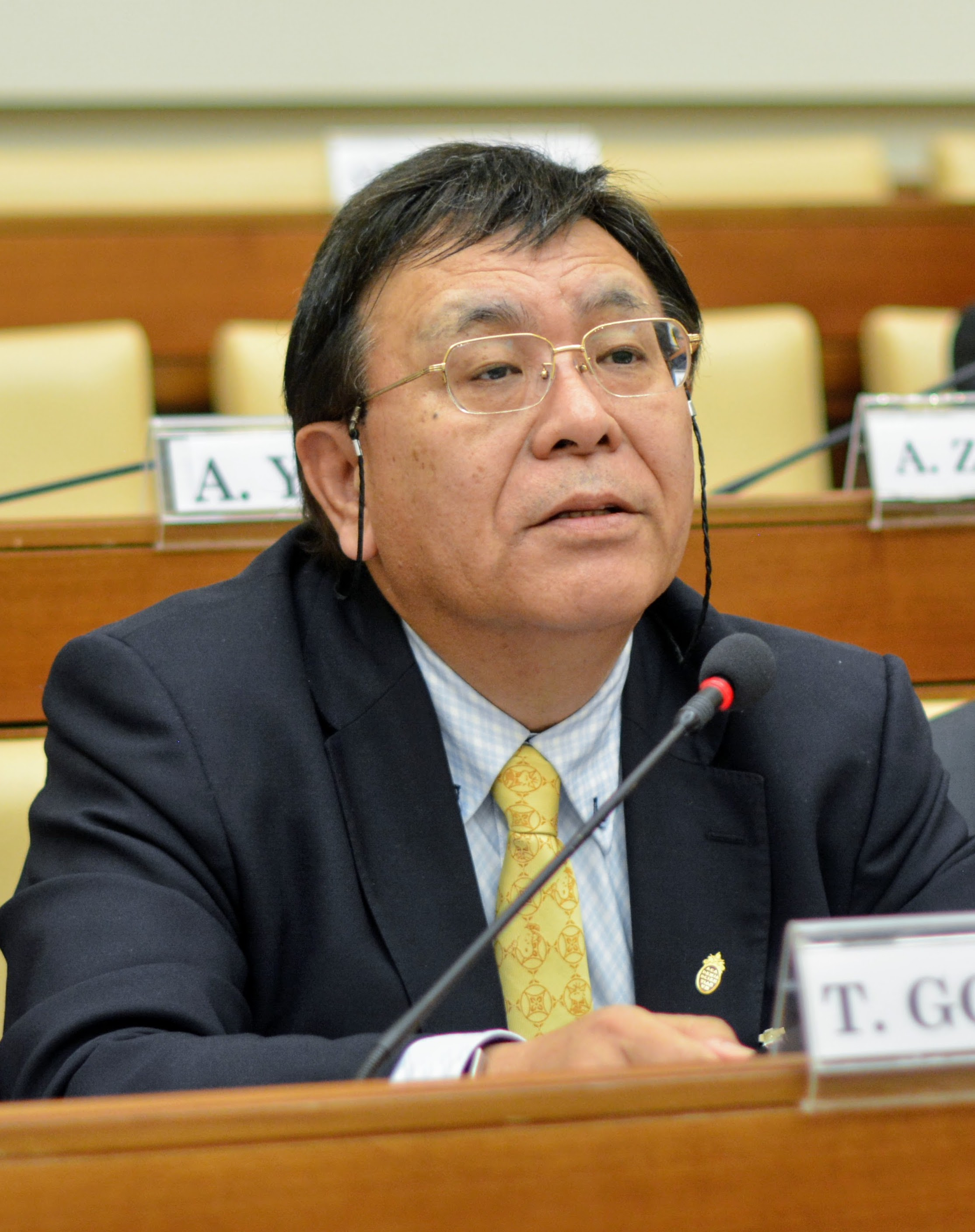
- Takashi Gojobori at the Pontifical Academy of Sciences, November 2018
- Born: October 24, 1951 (age 74); Fukuoka, Japan
- Education: Kyushu University
- Awards: Kihara Memorial Foundation Academic Award (1995); Foreign Honorary Member of the American Academy of Arts and Sciences (2006); Fellow of the AAAS (2006); Member of the Pontifical Academy of Sciences (2007); Purple Ribbon Medal (2009)
- Scientific career
- Fields: Molecular phylogenetics; Comparative genomics; Evolution; Genome diversity
- Workplaces: King Abdullah University of Science and Technology (KAUST); National Institute of Genetics; University of Texas Health Science Center at Houston
- Doctoral students: Prince Akishino

Takashi Gojobori (五條堀 孝, Gojobori Takashi; born October 24, 1951, Fukuoka) is a Japanese molecular biologist who is vice director of the National Institute of Genetics (NIG) and the DNA Data Bank of Japan (DDBJ) at NIG in Mishima, Japan. Gojobori is a distinguished professor at King Abdullah University of Science and Technology (KAUST) in Thuwal, Saudi Arabia. He is a professor of bioscience and acting director at the Computational Bioscience Research Center at KAUST.

He has also been co-appointed as the special research consultant of the National Institute of Advanced Industrial Science and Technology (AIST), and acts as a visiting professor at Keio University, University of Tokyo, and Tokyo Institute of Technology.

He is an associate member of the European Molecular Biology Organization (EMBO), a member of Academia Europea and an academician member of the Pontifical Academy of Sciences, Vatican.

== Education ==
Gojobori finished his Ph.D. in theoretical population genetics (1979) at Kyushu University, Japan. He was a research associate and research assistant professor at the University of Texas Health Science Center at Houston (UTHealth) for 4 years (1979–1983). He was also visiting assistant professor at Washington University in St. Louis (1985, 1986) and visiting research fellow at the Imperial Cancer Research Fund (ICRF) in London (1989).

== Research ==
He is the founding editor of the journal Genome Biology and Evolution, the executive editor of the journal Gene, academic editor of FEBS Letters, associate editor of Molecular Biology and Evolution and PLOS Genetics, and section editor of computer genomics in BMC Genomics. He has served on the editorial boards of six international journals including GigaScience. Previously he was the editor of Journal of Molecular Evolution for eight years (1995–2003). He is leader of the Japanese team of the H-Invitational international consortium who was tasked with creating a database linking the 21,037 validated human genes to their biological function.

Gojobori has worked extensively on the rates of synonymous and non-synonymous substitutions, positive selection, horizontal gene transfer, viral evolution, genome evolution, and comparative gene expression. In recent years, he has focused on the evolution of the brain and central nervous system, and COVID-19 or virus transmissions.

Gojobori has served as the Program Director of the Council for Science and Technology Policy (CSTP) of the Government of Japan and is the Science Officer of the Ministry of Education, Science, Sports, Culture, and Technology (MEXT). He has contributed to databases such as DDBJ/GenBank/EMBL and the H-Invitational human gene database.

He has had more than 400 publications in peer-reviewed international journals on comparative and evolutionary genomics. Gojobori has also contributed to the GenBank database construction as well as the H-Invitational human gene database.

== Honors ==
Gojobori is a Foreign Honorary Member of the American Academy of Arts and Sciences (2006) and fellow of the American Association for the Advancement of Science (AAAS) (2005). In 2006 Pope Benedict XVI appointed Gojobori as a member of the Pontifical Academy of Sciences. He has received the Gaetano Salvatore Gold Medal from Italy (2004). He was awarded the Kihara Memorial Foundation Academic Award in 1995 and the Purple Ribbon Medal and the Medal of Honor of Japan in 2009 for a series of his researches to pioneer the early age of "Molecular Evolutionary Studies using Genome Information." In 2022, he was elected as a fellow of the International Society for Computational Biology.
