= Kihara Memorial Foundation Academic Award =

Japanese science award

- Awarded for: outstanding original research in life sciences
- Country: Japan
- Presented by: Kihara Memorial Yokohama Foundation for the Advancement of Life Sciences
- First award: 1993
- Website: kihara.or.jp/award/academic_award.html

The Kihara Memorial Foundation Academic Award (木原記念財団学術賞, Kihara Kinen Zaidan Gakujutsushō) is an award for biological sciences in Japan. It is awarded annually by the Kihara Memorial Yokohama Foundation for the Achievement of Life Sciences, to commemorate Hitoshi Kihara, Japan's pioneer geneticist.

== Award information ==
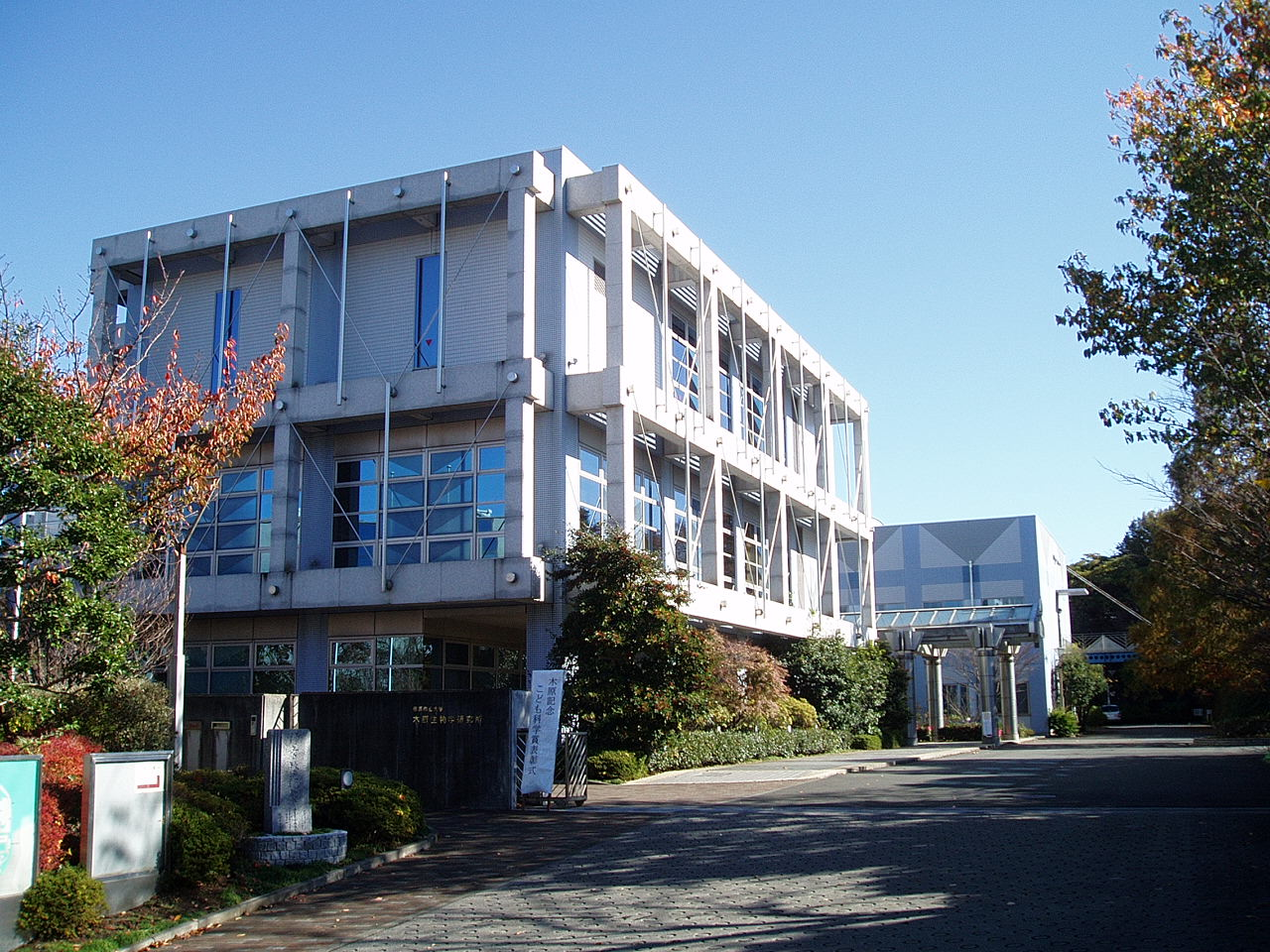
Kihara Institute for Biological Research

The Kihara Memorial Foundation Award is presented to young researchers who have conducted outstanding original research in life sciences. At the annual award presentation held at the Kihara Institute for Biological Research, winners receive 2 million yen, a diploma, and a silver statuette of Benthamidia japonica (Japanese flowering dogwood).

== Award winners ==
Notable award winners are:

- 1993: Taisei Nomura, Osaka University
- 1994: Makoto Asashima, University of Tokyo
- 1995: Takashi Gojobori, National Institute of Genetics
- 1999: Takao Kondo, Nagoya University
- 2001: Kunihiro Matsumoto, Nagoya University
- 2002: Shigeo Ohno, Yokohama City University
- 2006: Nobuki Matsuoka, Nagoya University
- 2009: Takashi Araki, Kyoto University
- 2011: Ken Shirasu, RIKEN
- 2014: Yukiko Goto, University of Tokyo

== See also ==
- List of biology awards
