= AMRC =

AMRC may refer to:

- Aerospace Maintenance and Regeneration Center
- Academy of Medical Royal Colleges
- Antarctic Meteorological Research Center
- Advanced Medical Research Center, Yokohama
- Amaravati Metro Rail Corporation
- Advanced Manufacturing Research Center, University of Sheffield
