= Yokohama City University =

Public university in Yokohama, Kanagawa, Japan

Coordinates: 35.334°N 139.618°E

- 横浜市立大学
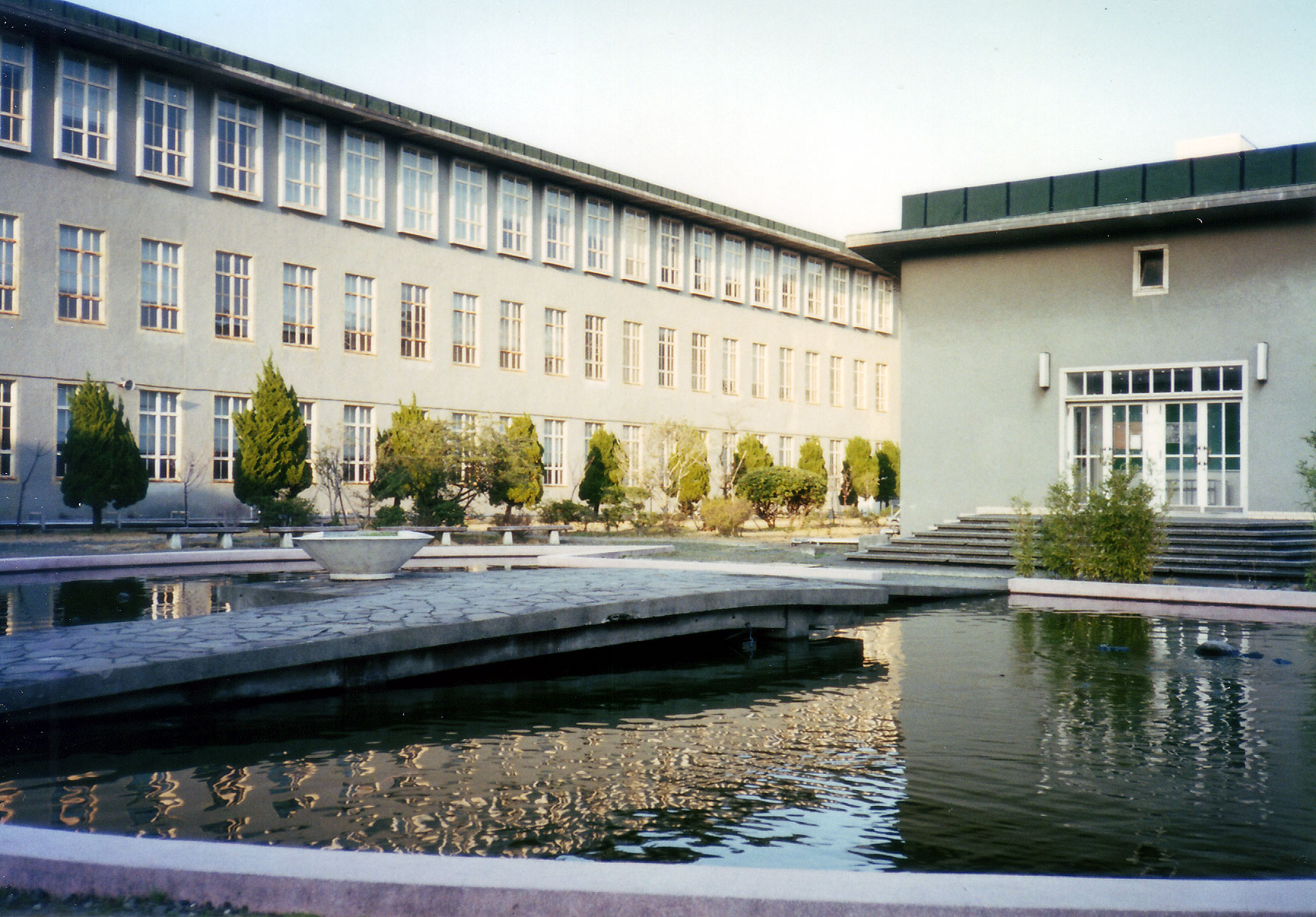
- Kanazawa-Hakkei Campus
- Motto: 教育重視・学生中心・地域貢献
- Motto in English: Emphasis on education, student-centeredness, and local contribution
- Type: Public
- Established: 1882
- President: Michiko Aihara
- Faculty: 687
- Undergraduates: 4232
- Postgraduates: 966
- Location: Yokohama, Kanagawa Prefecture, Japan
- Campus: Urban
- Mascot: Yochy (Ginkgo)
- Website: www.yokohama-cu.ac.jp/en

Yokohama City University (YCU) (横浜市立大学, Yokohama Shiritsu Daigaku) is a public university, in Yokohama, Kanagawa Prefecture, Japan. As of 2013, YCU has two faculties with a total of around 4,850 students, 111 of whom are foreign. YCU also has four campuses (Kanazawa-Hakkei, Fukuura, Maioka and Tsurumi) and two hospitals (YCU Hospital and YCU Medical Center). YCU is a member of the Port-City University League (PUL), and a core member of the Japanese University Network in the Bay Area (JUNBA). In 2017, YCU has been ranked #16th among "world's best small universities" in 2016-2017 (Times Higher Education), ranked at 23rd among life sciences institutes in Japan (Nature Index 2016).

== History ==
=== From Yokohama School of Commerce to Yokohama City University ===
The predecessor of YCU, the Yokohama School of Commerce (橫濱商法學校, Yokohama Shōhō Gakkō), was founded in 1882, initially maintained by an association of local merchants. In 1888, the school was renamed Yokohama Commercial School (橫濱商業學校, Yokohama Shōgyō Gakkō), a five-year school for boys (ages 14–19 or above). In 1917, Yokohama Commercial School was municipalized and in 1921 it became a seven-year commercial school (for ages 12–19 or above). The Ministry of Education urged the school to shorten the curriculum by two years, as Japanese Commercial School Regulations (1921) did not specify a seven-year course for commercial schools. In 1924, it became a five-year school with a two-year specialized course. In 1928, the specialized course became the Yokohama City College of Commerce (橫濱市立橫濱商業專門學校, Yokohama Shiritsu Yokohama Shōgyō Gakkō). In 1949, it was renamed Yokohama City Economics College and reorganized into Yokohama City University under Japan's new educational system.

=== From Juzen Hospital to Yokohama City University ===
Another predecessor of YCU was founded in 1874 as Juzen Hospital (十全醫院, Jūzen Iin). This hospital was municipalized in 1891. In 1944, Yokohama Municipal Medical College (橫濱市立醫學專門學校, Yokohama Shiritsu Igaku Senmon Gakkō)) was established, and Juzen Hospital became a college hospital. In 1947, after World War II, the medical college became Yokohama Medical School (横浜医科大学, Yokohama Ika Daigaku), a municipal university. Its three-year preparatory course was established in 1947, and the four-year main course was established in 1949. In 1952, the medical school was merged with Yokohama City University.

=== From Yokohama City University College of Nursing ===
Yokohama City University College of Nursing (横浜市立大学看護短期大学部, Yokohama Shiritsu Daigaku Kango Tanki Daigakubu) was a public junior college in Kanazawa-ku, Yokohama, Japan. It opened in 1898 as a vocational school, and was amalgamated with the Yokohama City University School of Medicine in 2005.

=== Recent history ===
In 1949, YCU had one faculty: the Faculty of Economics and Business Administration. In 1952, two faculties were added (School of Medicine and Faculty of Literature and Science). The subsequent history of YCU is as follows.

- 1984: Kihara Institute for Biological Research (KIBR) was transferred to YCU.
- 1995: Faculty of Literature and Science was reorganized into two faculties: Faculty of International Liberal Arts and Faculty of Science.
- 2005: Three faculties (Faculty of Economics and Business Administration, Faculty of Sciences, and Faculty of Humanities and International Studies) were integrated. International College of Arts and Sciences was established.
- 2005: Yokohama City University College of Nursing was transferred to YCU, and four-year Nursing Course was established.
- 2005: The Graduate School of Economics, the Graduate School of Business Administration, the Graduate School of Integrated Science, and the Graduate School of International Cultural Studies were integrated. International Graduate School of Arts and Sciences was established.
- 2006: Advanced Medical Research Center (AMRC) was established.
- 2007: YCU California Office was established as a core member of Japanese University Network in the Bay Area (JUNBA) in Santa Clara, California.
- 2009: International Graduate School of Arts and Sciences was reorganized and divided into the Graduate School of Urban Social and Cultural Studies, the Graduate School of Nanobioscience and the Graduate School of International Management.
- 2011: Japan International Cooperation Agency (JICA) began the international project for the Development of Wheat Breeding Materials for Sustainable Food Production through KIBR.
- 2012: Division of Global Urban and Regional Studies was established.
- 2013: Graduate School of Medical Life Science was established.
- 2014: YCU concluded a memorandum of understanding (MOU) relating to implementation of the “International College Program with Academic Training at Walt Disney World Resort” with Valencia College.
- 2018: The School of Data Science was established.
- 2019: International College of Arts and Sciences was reorganized and divided into School of International Liberal Arts, School of Economics and Business Administration, and School of Science.

== Campuses ==
=== Kanazawa-Hakkei Campus ===
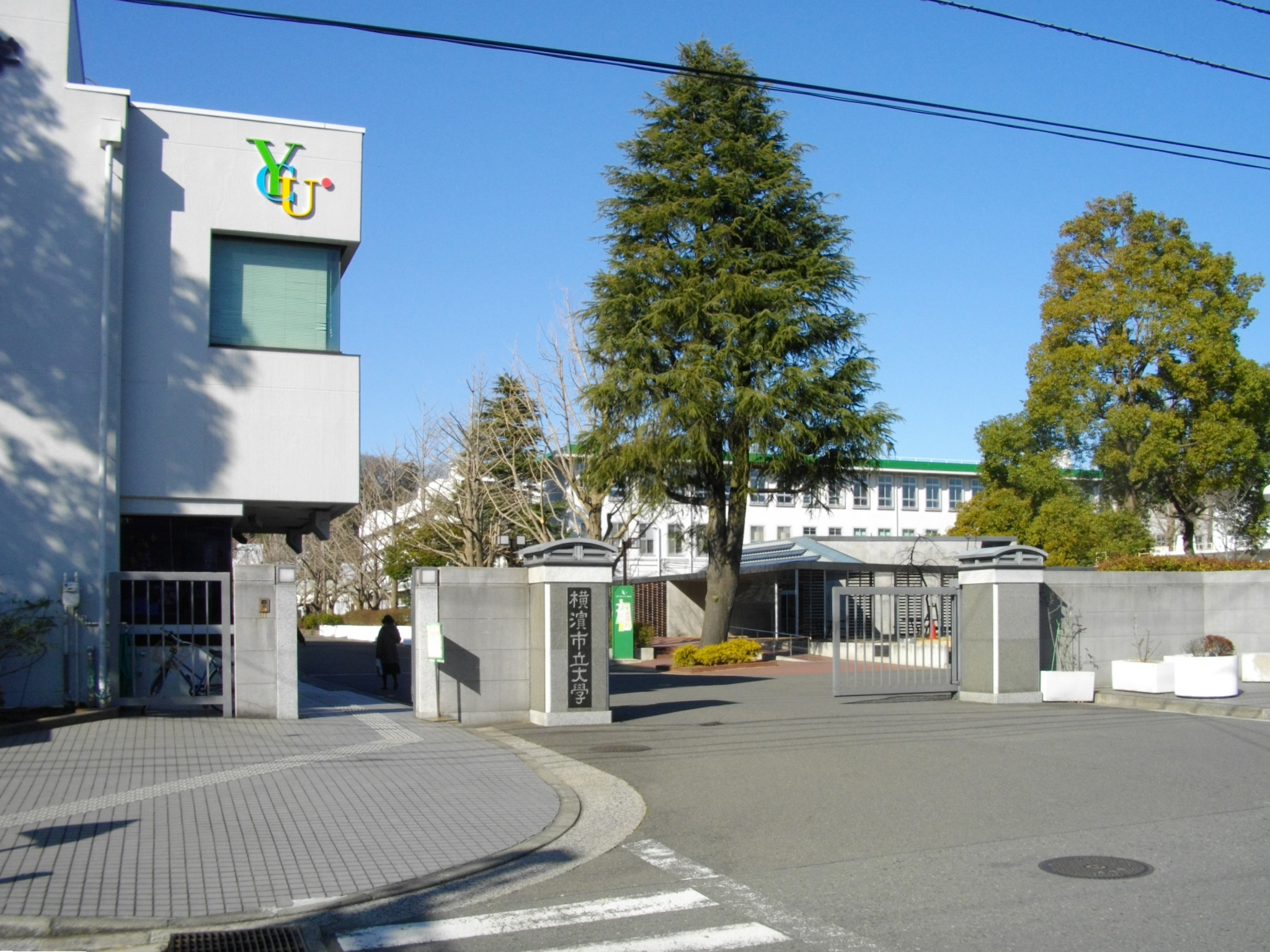
Kanazawa-Hakkei Campus

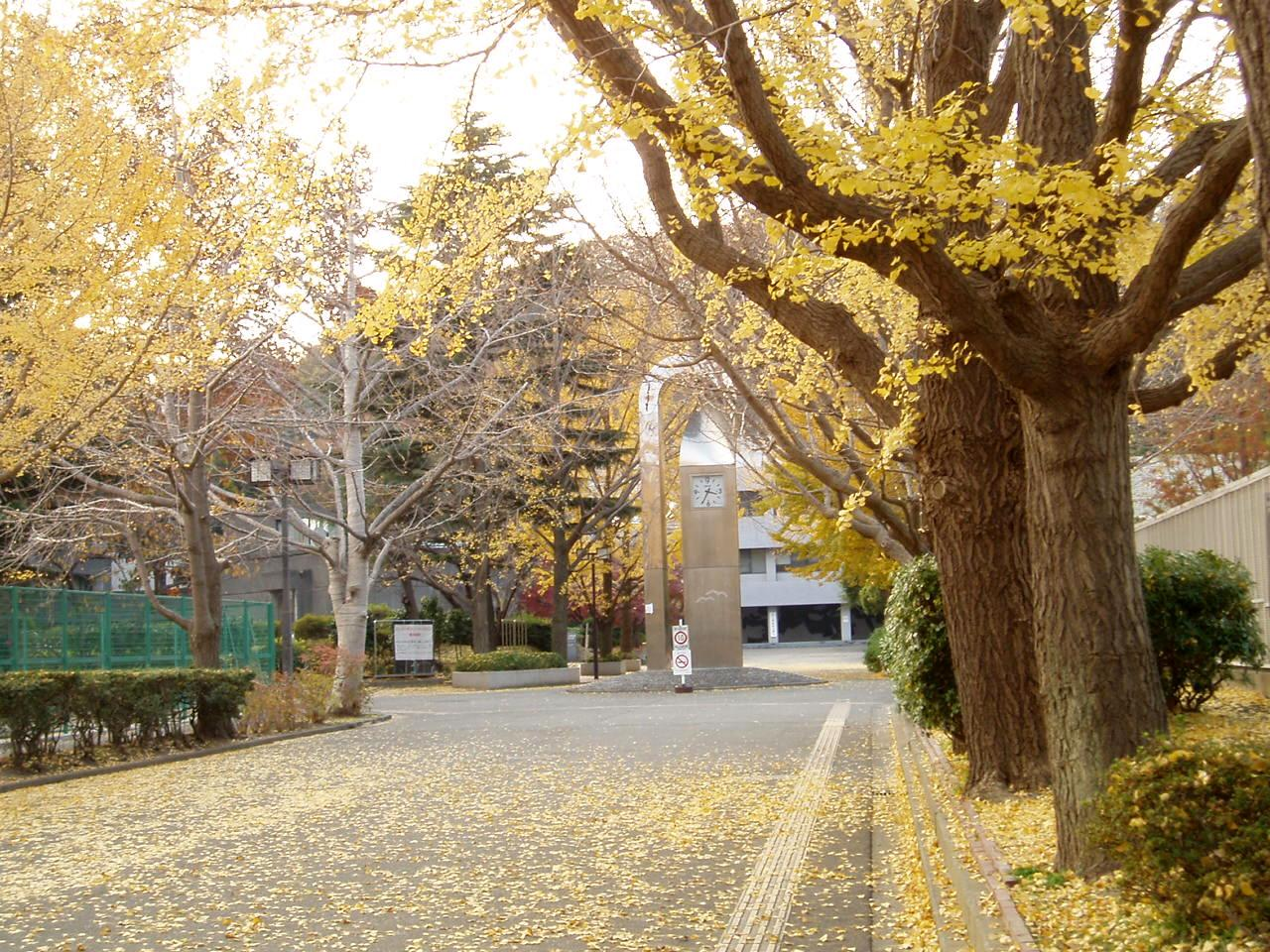
The clock tower in autumn

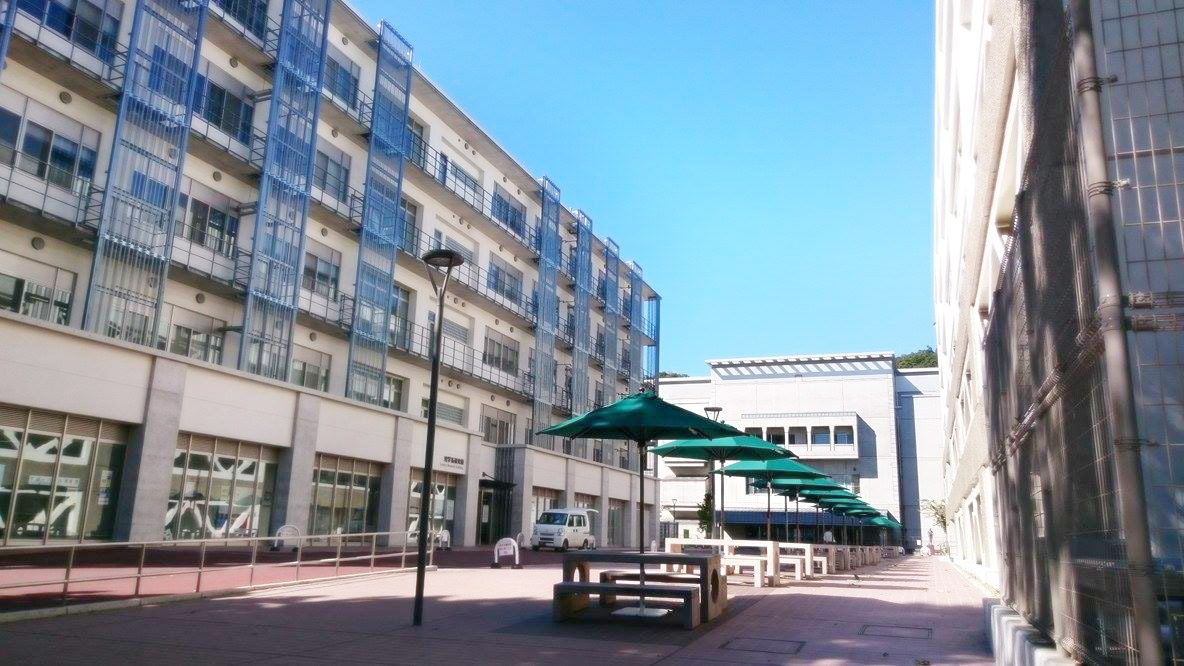
Science Research Building in Kanazawa-hakkei Campus

The Kanazawa-Hakkei Campus in Kanazawa-ku, Yokohama is one of the main campuses of YCU. Yochy, the mascot of YCU is a ginkgo leaf, from the trees found throughout the campus. One of the university's landmarks, the clock tower, is on this campus.

=== Fukuura Campus ===
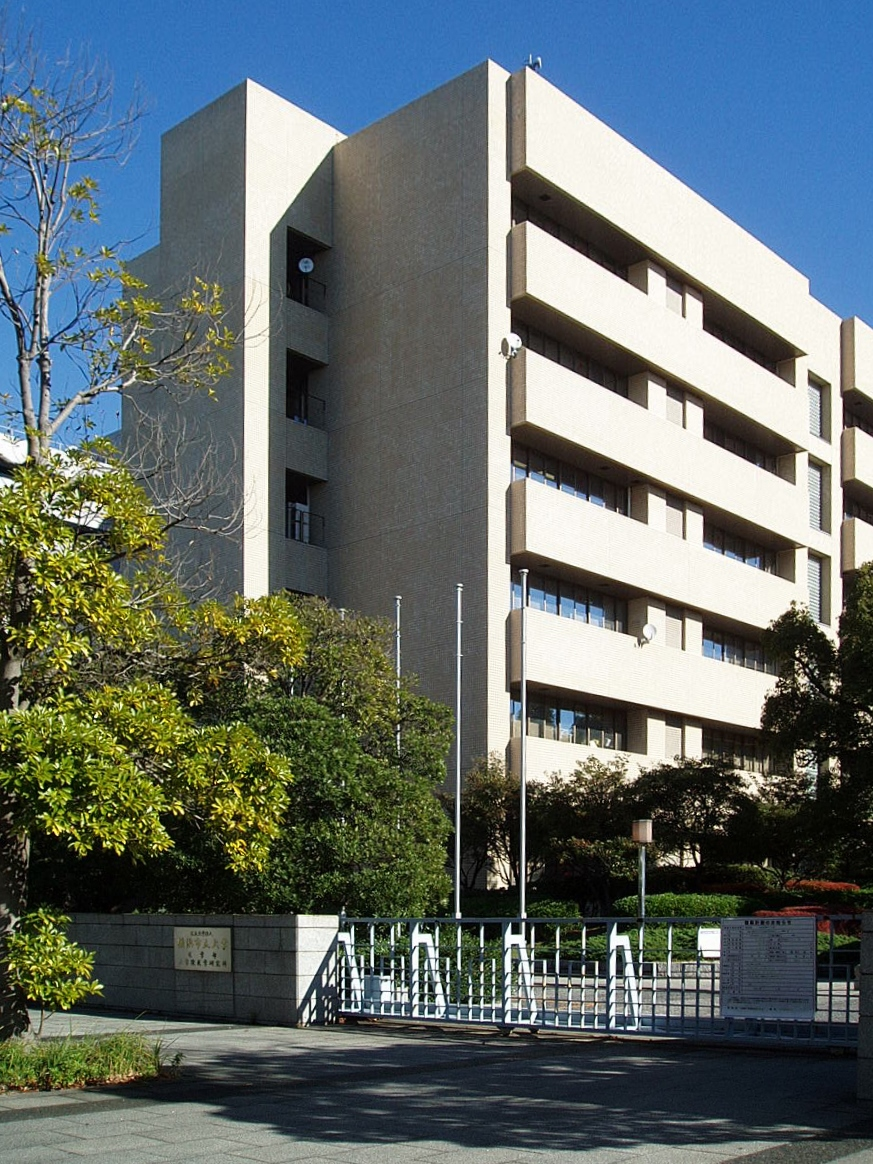
Fukuura Campus (School of Medicine)

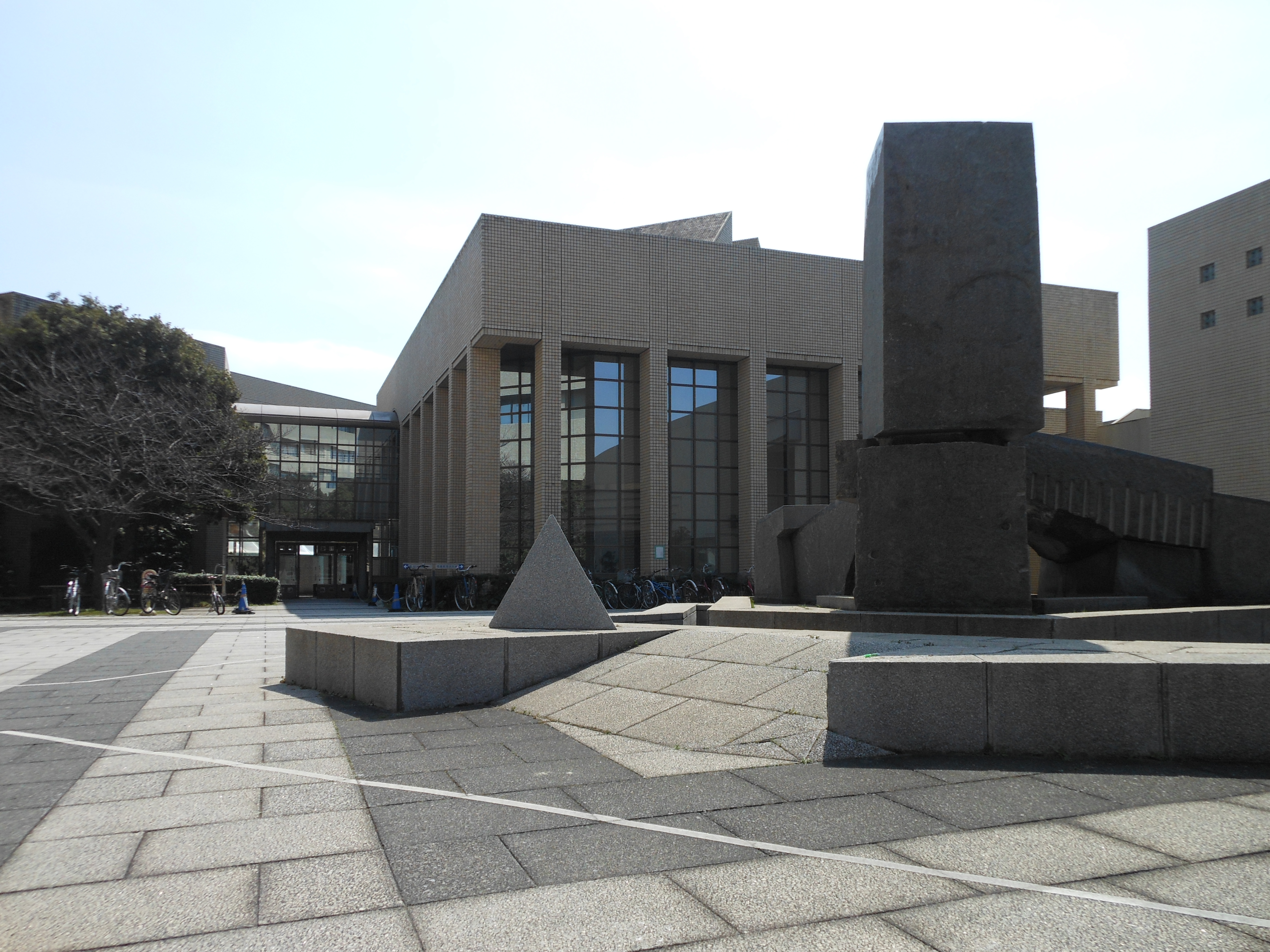
Hepburn Hall

The Fukuura Campus in Kanazawa-ku, Yokohama is one of the main campuses of YCU. It includes the YCU School of Medicine, Hospital, and Advanced Medical Research Center. It is connected to Shidai-Igakubu Station on the Yokohama Seaside Line. The Hepburn Hall is on this campus.

=== Maioka Campus ===
The Maioka Campus in Totsuka-ku, Yokohama is home to Kihara Institute for Biological Research (KIBR).

=== Tsurumi Campus ===
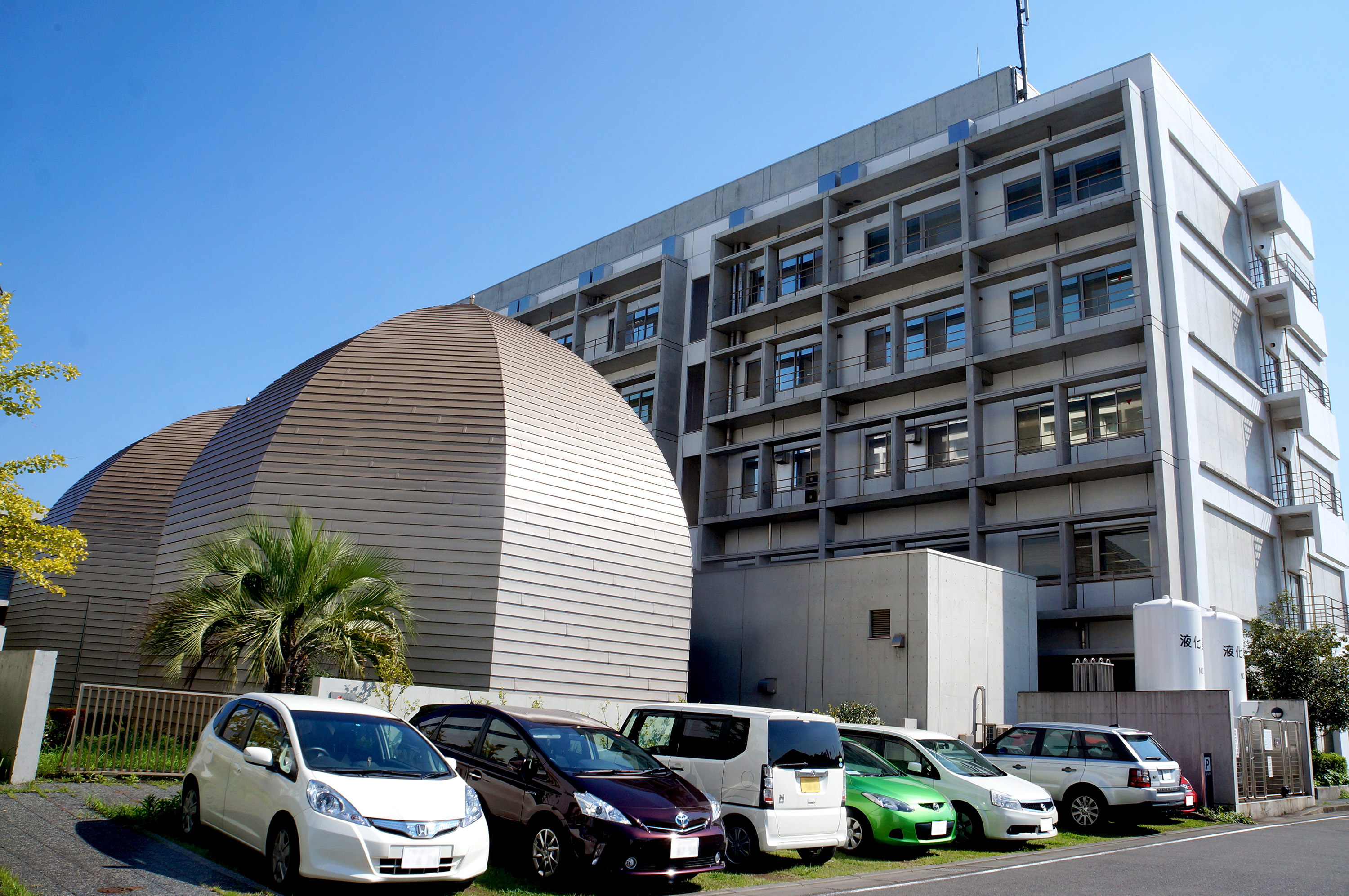
Tsurumi Campus

The Tsurumi Campus in Tsurumi-ku, Yokohama was established in 2001 as a graduate school partnership between YCU and RIKEN. RIKEN Yokohama researchers visit YCU as guest professors and provide guidance for students as part of a cooperative graduate school agreement.

== Faculties (undergraduate schools) ==
=== School of International Liberal Arts ===
- Department of International Liberal Arts

=== School of Economics and Business Administration ===
- Department of Economics and Business Administration

=== School of Science ===
- Department of Science

=== School of Data Science ===
- Department of Data Science

=== School of Medicine ===
- Medical Course (six-year)
- Nursing Course (four-year)

=== International College of Arts and Sciences ===
International College of Arts and Sciences will be reorganized and divided into School of International Liberal Arts, School of Economics and Business Administration, and School of Science in 2019.

- Division of Liberal Arts and International Studies
  - Department of Human Science
  - Department of Social Relations
  - Department of Arts and Cultures
- Division of Global Urban and Regional Studies
  - Department of Urban Planning and Community Development
  - Department of Urban and Regional Policy
  - Department of Global Cooperation and Area Studies
- Division of Economics and Business Administration
  - Department of Business Administration
  - Department of Accounting
  - Department of Economics
- Division of Sciences
  - Department of Materials Science
  - Department of Life and Environmental Science
  - Department of Medical Life Science

== Graduate schools ==
- Graduate School of Urban Social and Cultural Studies
  - Degree conferred: Master of Arts, Doctor of Philosophy
- Graduate School of International Management
  - Degree conferred: Master of Management, Master of Economics, Doctor of Business Administration, Doctor of Economics
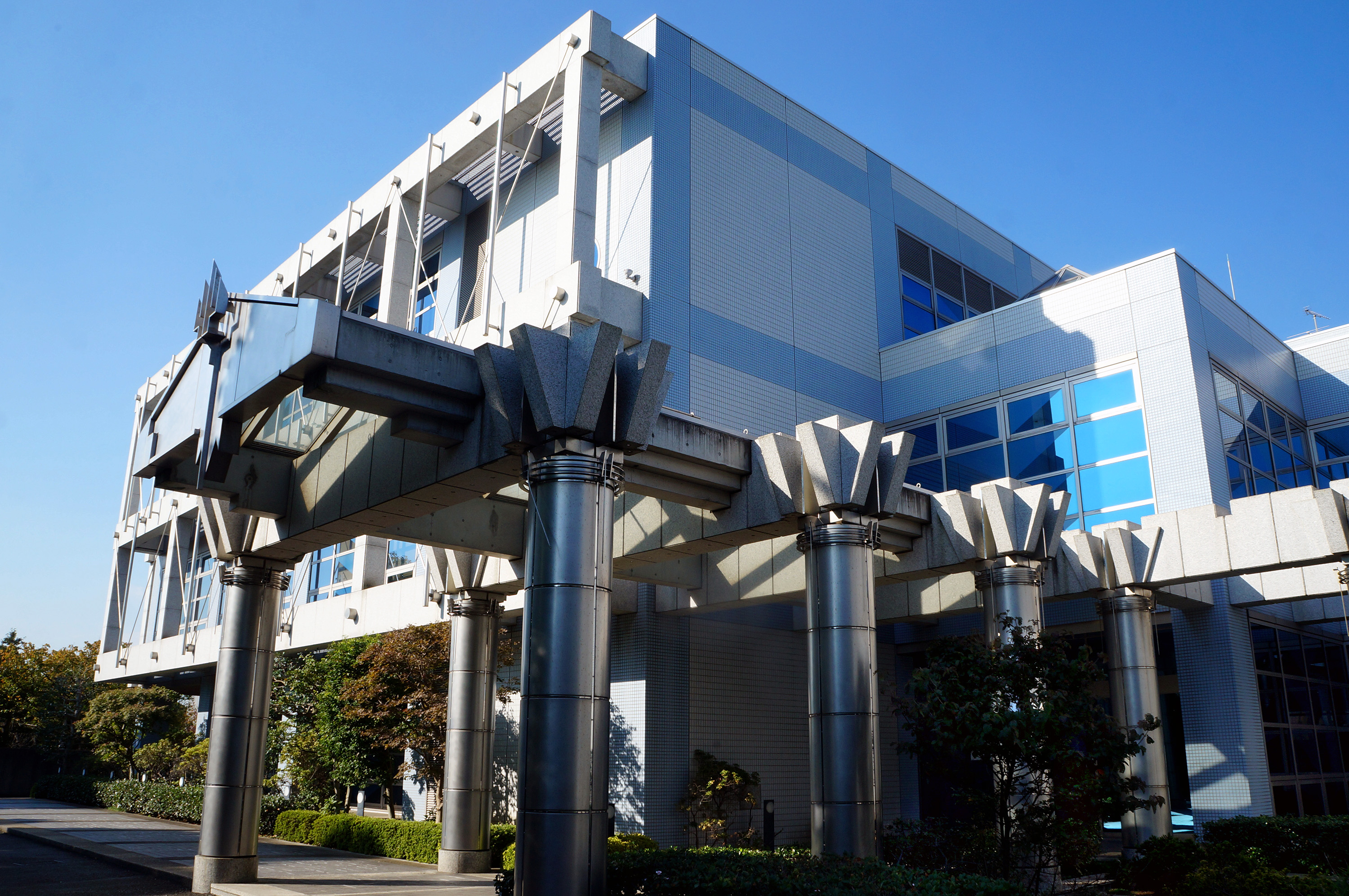
- Maioka Campus
  Graduate School of Nanobioscience
  - Degree conferred: Master of Science, Doctor of Science
- Graduate School of Medical Life Science
  - Degree conferred: Master of Science, Doctor of Science
- Graduate School of Medicine

== Joint graduate school of medicine program ==
The YCU Graduate School of Medicine is engaged in "Joint Graduate School Programs" with various establishments include the following.

- Kanagawa Cancer Center
- Kanagawa Children's Medical Center
- National Institute of Infectious Diseases
- National Institute of Radiological Sciences
- Pharmaceuticals and Medical Devices Agency
- RIKEN
- Yokohama National University

== Research centers and institutes ==
- Research Promotion Center
- Advanced Medical Research Center (AMRC)
- Kihara Institute for Biological Research (KIBR)

== University hospitals ==
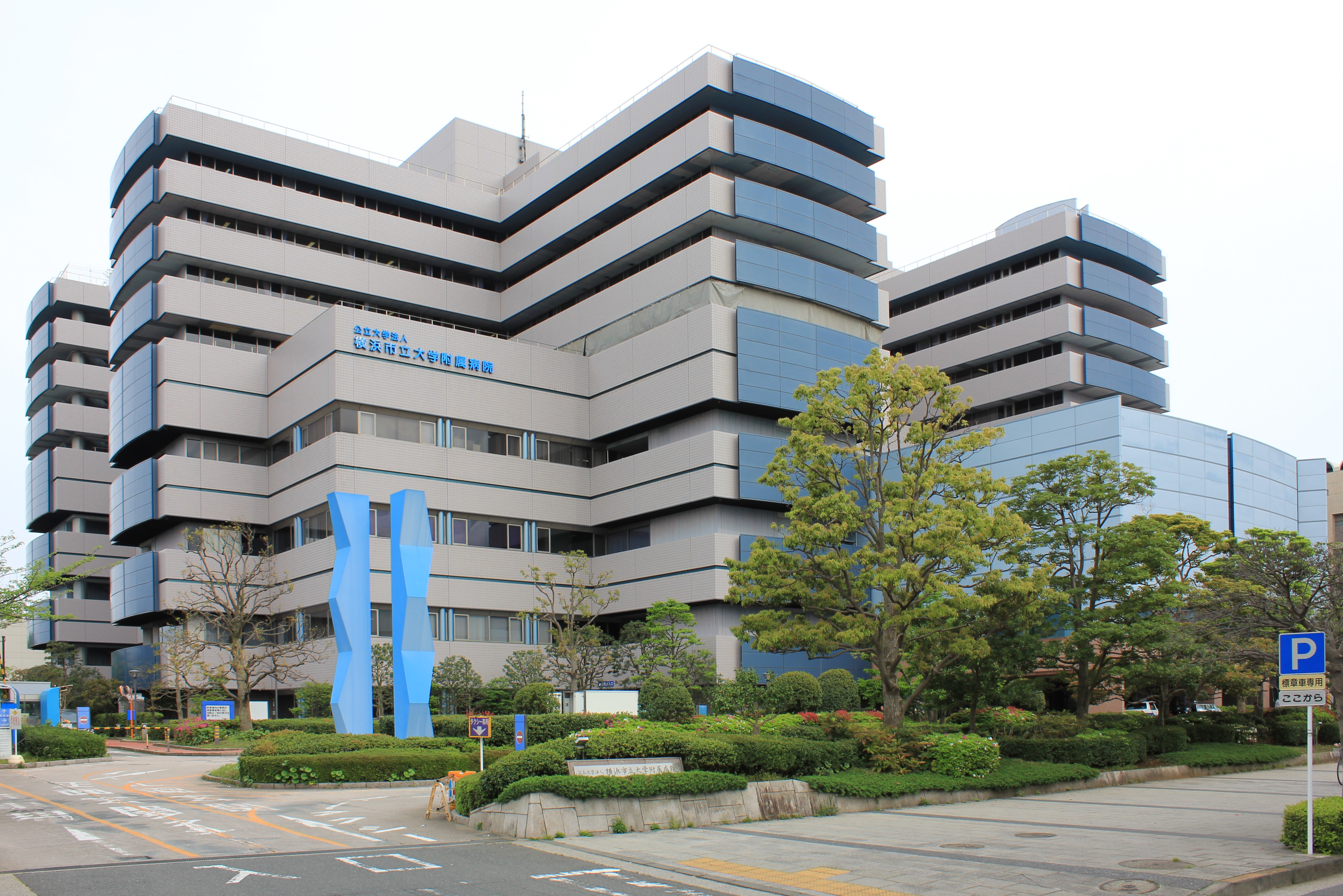
Yokohama City University Hospital

Yokohama City University Medical Center

=== Yokohama City University Hospital ===
The YCU Hospital in Kanazawa-ku, Yokohama has 654 beds, and in the 2012 fiscal year, treated 465,918 out-patients and 213,149 in-patients. The Hospital is a designated hospital as a Regional Cancer Care Hospital, AIDS Care Central Core Hospital and an approved as a Specific Function Hospital.

== International cooperation ==
YCU has exchange agreements with the following universities.

- University of California, San Diego
- University of California, Los Angeles
- University of Vienna
- Incheon National University
- Oxford Brookes University
- Shanghai Normal University
- Ca' Foscari University of Venice
- University of Bucharest
- Universiti Sains Malaysia
- Vietnam National University, Ho Chi Minh City
- University of the Philippines

Some graduate schools have engaged in joint research with the following African universities.

- University of Zambia
- University of Pretoria
- University of Johannesburg
- Makerere University
- University of Malawi

== Notable people ==
=== Alumni ===
- Masatoshi Ito - founder of Seven & I Holdings Co. and supporter of the Peter F. Drucker and Masatoshi Ito Graduate School of Management
- Yoichi Nishimaru - physician and the author of Afternoon in the Forensic Medicine Classroom (法医学教室の午後)
- Yoshiharu Sekino - surgeon and explorer famous for traveling "the Great Journey", tracing the route of mankind which spread from its origin in Africa to the Americas in reverse, starting at the southern tip of South America.
- Takehiko Ogawa - urologist and developmental biologist famous for in vitro spermatogenesis.
- Hase Seishū - novelist known for writing yakuza crime fictions.
- Ken Hirai - R&B and pop singer

=== Faculty ===
- Duane B. Simmons - American physician, educator and lay Christian missionary
- Neil Gordon Munro - Scottish physician and anthropologist
- Taikichiro Mori - economist and founder of Mori Building Company
- Hiroshi Nakamura - biochemist and historian of cartography
- Masayuki Kikuchi - seismologist famous for real-time seismology
- Makoto Asashima - biologist and the discoverer of Activin
- Kenji Kosaka - psychiatrist and the discoverer of Dementia with Lewy bodies
- Shigeo Ohno - biochemist famous for pioneer research on cell polarity
- Naomichi Matsumoto - geneticist known for identifying several causative genes for human diseases

== Honorary doctoral degree recipients ==
Honorary doctoral degree recipients include the following.

- Harold W. Kroto (November 4, 1997)
- Howard A. Bern (November 12, 1997)
- Elizabeth Mann-Borgese (December 8, 1998)
- Harold J.Simon (March 23, 1999)
- Yataro Tajima (October 31, 2001)
- Kenneth D. Butler (November 12, 2001)
- Ma Ying-jeou (July 12, 2006)
- Masatoshi Ito (October 12, 2007)

== See also ==
- Yokohama City University College of Nursing
