= Takehiko Ogawa =

Takehiko Ogawa (小川 毅彦, Ogawa Takehiko) is a Japanese urologist and developmental biologist, known for his pioneer research on in vitro spermatogenesis. He is Professor of Proteomics at Graduate School of Medical Life Science, Yokohama City University.

== Contribution ==
In 2011, Ogawa and his colleagues succeeded to produce functional sperm from spermatogonial stem cells with the testis of mouse using an organ culture method, which was the first demonstration of mammalian. The result could change views about fertility and spermatogenesis and result in new diagnostics for male infertility as well as treatment and follow-up of patients with cancer. In 2014, his research group reported that a sample of frozen testicle has been used to produce live offspring in experiments on mice, and this breakthrough could have important implications for boys with cancer who become infertile due to chemotherapy treatments.

== Biography ==
Ogawa received his M.D. in 1985 and his doctorate in Pathology in 1989 from Yokohama City University. After clinical residency in Urology, he worked as an urologist at several hospitals in Yokohama and neighboring cities. Wishig to study germ cells, he served as a postdoctoral fellow under Ralph L. Brinster at University of Pennsylvania between 1995 and 1998. On returning to Japan, he became a member of the faculty of Yokohama City University.
