= Port-City University League =

- 国際みなとまち大学リーグ
- Abbreviation: PUL
- Formation: 2006
- Purpose: To develop a global network among those port cities and universities, and exchange ideas and views about the culture related to ports
- Headquarters: Japan
- Location: Yokohama
- Members: 19 universities
- Website: global.ynu.ac.jp/en/strategies/pul/

The Port-City University League (PUL) is an international league of universities located in major port cities around the world. It was established in 2006, and the first general meeting was held in Yokohama, Japan, in 2006.

== List of members universities ==
As of 1st December 2019, the PUL consists of the following 19 universities from 14 countries.

- Alexandria University (Alexandria, Egypt)
- Dalian University of Technology (Dalian, China)
- Ho Chi Minh City University of Technology (Ho Chi Minh, Vietnam)
- Indian Institute of Technology Madras (Chennai, India)
- Incheon National University (Incheon, South Korea)
- Istanbul Technical University (Istanbul, Turkey)
- Pukyong National University (Busan, South Korea)
- Shanghai Jiao Tong University (Shanghai, China)
- University of British Columbia (Vancouver, Canada)
- University of Lisbon (Lisbon, Portugal)
- University of São Paulo (São Paulo, Brazil)
- University of Southampton (Southampton, United Kingdom)
- Yokohama City University (Yokohama, Japan)
- Yokohama National University (Yokohama, Japan)
- King Abdulaziz University (Jeddah, Saudi Arabia)
- Shandong University (Qingdao, China)
- Ghent University Global Campus (Incheon, South Korea)
- Sumatera Institute of Technology (Lampung, Indonesia)
- (Republic of Ireland) University College Cork (Cork, Ireland)
