= Shigeo Ohno =

Japanese molecular biologist (born 1952)

Shigeo Ohno (大野 茂男, Ōno Shigeo; born March 1952) is a Japanese molecular biologist known for his pioneer research on Protein Kinase C (PKC) and Cell Polarity. His works led to the fundamental understanding of cell polarity in response to cell signaling.

== Contribution ==
After the pivotal discovery of PKC by Yasutomi Nishizuka, in the mid 1980s, Ohno and his colleagues found novel PKC isotypes (nPKC) and atypical PKC isotypes (aPKC). These findings showed that PKC family plays various rules in cell signaling.

On the other hand, the concept of cell polarity arises primarily through the localization of specific proteins to specific areas of the cell membrane. In 1988, Kenneth J. Kemphues and his colleagues identified par (partitioning defective) genes that are involved in cell-fate specification in Caenorhabditis elegans. In the mid 1990s, Kemphues research group cloned Par1 and Par3 genes in C. elegans, showing PAR1 is enriched at the posterior periphery in the cell while PAR3 is found at the anterior periphery.

In 1998, Ohno's research group found that aPKC is essential for proper asymmetric cell divisions and co-localizes with PAR3 in C. elegans, indicating the relationship between intracellular signal transduction and cell polarity. Also, they discovered aPKC-specific interacting protein, ASIP, which is a mammalian homologue of C. elegans PAR3. These pioneer works led the significant finding of a conserved PAR3-PAR6-aPKC protein complex regulating cell polarity in response to cell signaling.

== Biography ==
Ohno was born in 1952 in Niigata Prefecture, Japan. He obtained his B.S. in 1975 and his Ph.D. in Biochemistry in 1980 from The University of Tokyo. His supervisor, Kazutomo Imabori, led Yoshinori Ohsumi, the 2016 Nobel laureate in Physiology or Medicine, in the same lab.

From 1980 to 1983, Ohno served as a postdoctoral fellow at the Cancer Institute, Japanese Foundation for Cancer Research to investigate Interferons with Tadatsugu Taniguchi. From 1983 to 1991, he was a research associate under Koichi Suzuki at Tokyo Metropolitan Institute of Medical Science to investigate Calpain and PKC. He spent 3 months as a visiting scholar at Yale University in 1988 under Frank Ruddle.

In 1991, Ohno became Professor and Chair of the Department of Molecular Biology at Yokohama City University School of Medicine, and led several medical students and junior researchers, as well as actively advanced collaborative research with physician scientists. His lab focused on cell signaling via PKC and the molecular mechanisms how cell polarity is related to other signaling pathways such as cell growth, apoptosis and carcinogenesis. Another project is the mechanism of the quality control of mRNA, a mechanism called nonsense-mediated mRNA decay.

In 2017, after becoming Professor Emeritus, Ohno served as President of the Consortium of Biological Sciences (ConBio 2017) in Kobe, Japan, which was also the 26th international conference of the Federation of National Societies of Biochemistry and Molecular Biology in the Asian and Oceanian Region (FAOBMB).

== Honors and awards ==
- 1989: Young Investigator Award (Japanese Biochemical Society)
- 1991: Young Investigator Award (Japanese Cancer Association)
- 2002: Kihara Memorial Foundation Academic Award

== Editorial activities ==
Ohno served as an editor of The Journal of Biochemistry, which was founded in 1922 and publishes the results of original research in the fields of Biochemistry, Molecular Biology, Cell Biology, and Biotechnology.
