= Makoto Asashima =

Japanese developmental biologist

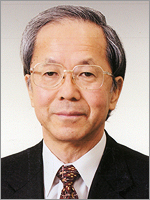
- Education: University of Tokyo
- Known for: Activin
- Awards: Imperial Prize (2001)
- Scientific career
- Fields: Developmental biology
- Workplaces: Tokyo University of Science; AIST, Japan; University of Tokyo; Yokohama City University; Free University of Berlin

Makoto Asashima (浅島 誠, Asashima Makoto; born 1944) is a Japanese developmental biologist known for his pioneer research on Activin. He is Professor Emeritus of the University of Tokyo and Yokohama City University. He is also Vice President of the Tokyo University of Science.

== Contribution ==
Asashima and his colleagues identified Activin in 1990, which exhibits a wide range of biological activities including regulation of cellular proliferation and differentiation.

== Biography ==
Asashima was born in Sado, Niigata in 1944. He graduated from Tokyo University of Education in March 1967, and received his Ph.D. from The University of Tokyo in 1972. He was a postdoctoral fellow under Heinz Tiedemann at Free University of Berlin between 1972 and 1974, and a member of the faculty of Yokohama City University between 1972 and 1993, before being appointed as a professor at The University of Tokyo in 1993.

== Recognition ==
＊1994：［Siebold Prize ] (Germany)

- 1994: Kihara Memorial Foundation Academic Award (Japan)
- 2001: Imperial Prize of the Japan Academy (Japan)

＊2002：［The Prince Hitachi Prize for comparative oncology](Japan)

- 2008: Person of Cultural Merit (Japan)
- 2008: Erwin-Stein-Preises (Germany)
