= C. Clark Cockerham =

American geneticist

- Born: Columbus Clark Cockerham; December 21, 1921; Mountain Park, North Carolina
- Died: November 4, 1996 (aged 74)
- Education: North Carolina State College of Agriculture and Engineering; Iowa State College
- Known for: Quantitative genetics
- Spouse: Joyce Allen Cockerham
- Children: C. Clark Cockerham Jr. Jean Davis; Bruce A. Cockerham
- Awards: North Carolina Award (1976)
- Scientific career
- Fields: Genetics
- Institutions: North Carolina State University
- Thesis: Genetic covariation among characteristics of swine (1952)
- Doctoral advisors: John Whittemore Gowen; Jay Laurence Lush
- Doctoral students: Ken-Ichi Kojima; Bruce Weir

Columbus Clark Cockerham (December 21, 1921 – November 4, 1996) was an American statistical geneticist known for his work in quantitative genetics.

== Early life and education ==
Cockerham was born on December 21, 1921, in Mountain Park, North Carolina. He grew up nearby on his family's farm. He received his B.S. degree in agriculture from the North Carolina State College of Agriculture and Engineering in 1943. After serving in the United States Marine Corps during World War II, he returned to North Carolina State College of Agriculture and Engineering, where he received his M.S. in animal industry in 1949. In 1952, he received his Ph.D. from Iowa State College, where he studied with Jay Lush.

== Career ==
In 1952, Cockerham became an assistant professor of biostatistics at the University of North Carolina at Chapel Hill. The following year, he joined North Carolina State University (NCSU) as an associate professor of statistics. At NCSU, he later became the William Neal Reynolds Professor of Statistics and Genetics and the director of the NIH Project Program in Statistics. In 1963, he successfully persuaded the National Institute of General Medical Sciences to award him a research grant for a program in quantitative genetics, which he directed until his retirement in 1990. During this time, NCSU's quantitative genetics program was the largest project at NCSU that was funded by a federal grant.

== Honors and awards ==
Cockerham was elected a member of the National Academy of Sciences in 1974. He received the North Carolina Award in science in 1976, the O. Max Gardner Award in 1980, and NCSU's Holladay Medal in 1994. He was also a recipient of the Gamma Sigma Delta Award of Merit and a fellow of the American Society of Agronomy.

== Personal life and death ==
Cockerham was married to Joyce Evelyn Allen, with whom he had three children: C. Clark Cockerham Jr., Jean Davis, and Bruce A. Cockerham. C. Clark Cockerham died on November 4, 1996.
