= Yoshiharu Sekino =

Yoshiharu Sekino (関野 吉晴, Sekino Yoshiharu; born 20 January 1949, Tokyo) is a Japanese surgeon, explorer, travel writer, photographer and anthropologist.

== Biography ==
Sekino was born in 1949 in Tokyo. While a student at Hitotsubashi University, he cofounded and participated in a university team that descended the entire length of the Amazon, thereafter travelling around South America. He received a B.A. in law from Hitotsubashi University in 1975 and an M.D. from Yokohama City University School of Medicine in 1982.

Since 2002 Sekino has been a professor of cultural anthropology at Musashino Art University.

== Great Journey ==
Sekino has worked as a surgeon in hospitals in western suburban Tokyo.

He is better known for his travels in Peru and elsewhere in South America as well as in Africa, where his explorations into the origins of mankind were made into a television series, Gurēto jānī (グレートジャーニー, i.e., "Great Journey"), broadcast on Fuji Television and later available on DVDs.

Starting in 1974, Sekino has published a stream of books about South America, anthropology, exploration, prehistoric demography, and more — some of which are primarily photographic.
