= Yoichi Nishimaru =

Japanese physician (1927–2020)

- 西丸與
- Born: 14 March 1927; Tokyo, Japan
- Died: 3 April 2020 (aged 93)
- Occupations: Physician, university professor, author
- Known for: Medical jurisprudence
- Title: Professor emeritus

Academic background
- Education: Yokohama City University

Academic work
- Discipline: Medicine
- Sub-discipline: Medical jurisprudence
- Institutions: Yokohama Medical University, Yokohama City University,

Notes
- Some infobox data has been translated from the Japanese Wikipedia

Yoichi Nishimaru (西丸 與一, Nishimaru Yoichi; 14 March 1927 – 3 April 2020) was a Japanese physician specializing in medical jurisprudence. His books were so popular that they became best-sellers in Japan.

== Biography ==
Nishimaru was born in Yokohama. He studied medicine at Yokohama Medical College (present-day Yokohama City University School of Medicine), and was appointed Professor of medical jurisprudence there in 1973. While working at Yokohama City University, he wrote some enlightening essays on forensic medicine, including Afternoon in the Forensic Medicine Classroom which was made into a TV program in Japan. After retiring from Yokohama City University and becoming Professor Emeritus, he became a ship's doctor.

== Works ==
- Nishimaru, Yoichi (1982). 法医学教室の午後 [Afternoon in the Forensic Medicine Classroom]. Tokyo: Asahi Shimbun. ISBN 4022549998.
- Nishimaru, Yoichi (1986). 続法医学教室の午後 [Afternoon of Connection Forensic Classroom]. Tokyo: Asahi Shimbun. ISBN 4022604190.
- Nishimaru, Yoichi (1995). 法医学教室との別れ [Farewell to Forensic Classroom]. Tokyo: Asahi Shimbun. ISBN 4022610786.
- Nishimaru, Yoichi (2003). ドクター・トド船に乗る [Doctor Walrus Goes to Sea]. Tokyo: Asahi Shimbun. ISBN 4022578459.
