= Hiroshi Nakamura (biochemist) =

Japanese biochemist (1890–1974)

- Born: March 25, 1890; Date, Fukushima, Japan
- Died: February 7, 1974 (aged 83); Tokyo, Japan
- Education: University of Paris; University of Tokyo
- Known for: Dietary element Hemolysis; Cartography
- Awards: Imago Mundi Award
- Scientific career
- Fields: Biochemistry; Cartography
- Workplaces: Yokohama City University; Keijō Imperial University; Pasteur Institute
- Doctoral advisor: Gabriel Bertrand

Hiroshi Nakamura (中村 拓, Nakamura Hiroshi; March 25, 1890 – February 7, 1974) was a Japanese biochemist known for first suggesting that Nickel may be a dietary element. He made a great contribution to the understanding of dietary element. In addition, he was one of Japan's most accomplished historians of cartography.

== Biography ==
Nakamura obtained his medical degree from Tokyo Imperial University in 1920. Wishing to pursue advanced study in biochemistry, he went to Paris to join the research staff at the Pasteur Institute. From 1921 to 1929, he studied under Gabriel Bertrand focussing on the biological rules of dietary element. During that time he received two doctorates: Doctor of Science from the Sorbonne in 1924 and Doctor of Medicine from Tokyo Imperial University in 1925.

On returning to Japan in 1929, Nakamura was appointed Professor of Medical Chemistry at Keijō Imperial University. He continued a productive career in biochemistry, publishing papers on Hemolysis. After the Second World War, he became Professor and Chairman of the Department of Biochemistry, Yokohama City University School of Medicine.

In addition to being biochemist, he continued historical researches which threw light upon many of the dark problems concerning Japanese and Chinese old maps. For his outstanding achievements on cartography, in 1961, he was awarded the degree of Doctor of Letters from University of Tokyo.

== Nakamura Library ==
Nakamura died in Tokyo on 7 February 1974, at the age of 83. After his death, his son donated his historical collections to Meiji University, and then the Dr Hirshi Nakamura's Library was established at the University for the public.
