= John Whittemore Gowen =

American biologist

John Gowen
- Born: John Whittemore Gowen; September 5, 1893; Evinston, Florida
- Died: September 14, 1967 (aged 74); Fort Collins, Colorado
- Education: University of Maine; Columbia University
- Known for: Gene expression Radiation biology
- Spouse: Marie Helena Stadler (m. 1917–1967)
- Children: Elaine Stadler Gowen; Helen Marie Gowen
- Scientific career
- Fields: Biology; Genetics
- Institutions: Iowa State College; Colorado State University
- Thesis: A Biometrical Study of Crossing Over: On the Mechanism of Crossing Over in the Third Chromosome of Drosophila Melanogaster (1917)
- Doctoral advisors: Thomas Hunt Morgan; Edmund Beecher Wilson
- Other academic advisors: Raymond Pearl
- Doctoral students: C. Clark Cockerham

John Whittemore Gowen (September 5, 1893 – September 14, 1967) was an American biologist and geneticist.

== Biography ==
Gowen was born in Evinston, Florida, on September 5, 1893, to Charles Hayes and Gertrude Whittemore Gowen. He received his B.S. and M.S. degrees from the University of Maine in 1914 and 1915, respectively. His advisor for his master's degree was Raymond Pearl. In 1917, he received his Ph.D. from Columbia University, where his advisors were Edmund Beecher Wilson and Thomas Hunt Morgan. Gowen then worked as a biologist at the Maine Agricultural Experimental Station until 1926, when he joined the Rockefeller Institute for Medical Research as a research associate.

In 1937, Gowen joined the faculty of Iowa State College as a professor of genetics. He was head of the Department of Genetics there from 1948 to 1959. In 1964, he retired from Iowa State to become Professor of radiation biology and genetics at Colorado State University, a position he held until his death.

Gowen's research focused on gene expression and the genetics of disease resistance, as well as the biological effects of exposure to radiation. He was a member of the Biometric Society, the American Genetic Association, the Institute of Mathematical Statistics, and the American Association for the Advancement of Science. He served as president of the Genetics Society of America in 1952.

Gowen married Marie Helena Stadler on September 10, 1917. They had two children: Elaine Stadler and Helen Marie. Gowen died on September 14, 1967, in Fort Collins, Colorado.
