= Kihara Institute for Biological Research =

Japanese research institute

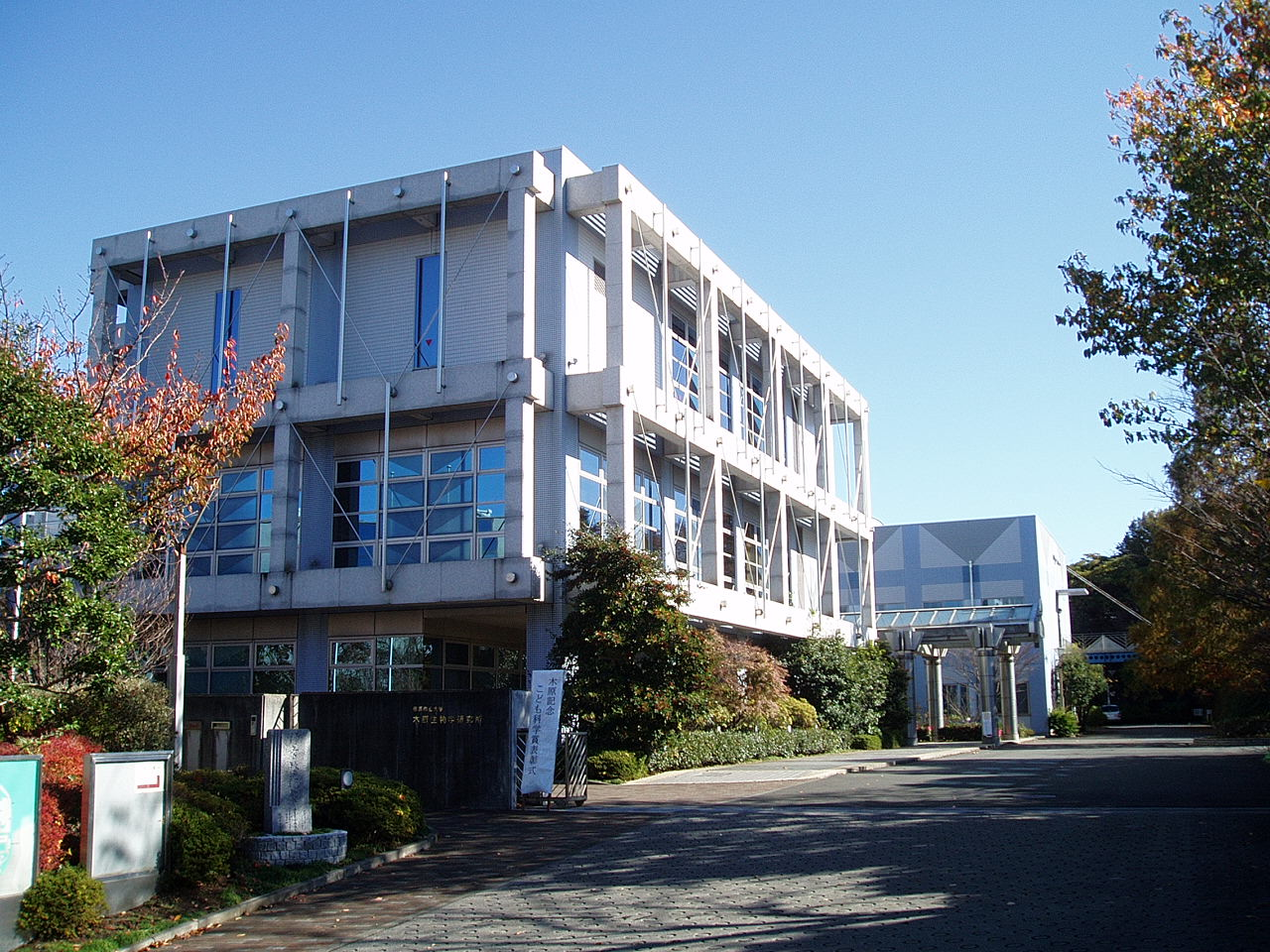
- Established: 1942
- Director/Dean: Yasunari Ogihara, PhD
- Address: 641-12 Maioka, Totsuka, Yokohama 244-0813, Japan
- Location: Totsuka-ku, Yokohama
- Website: www.yokohama-cu.ac.jp/kihara

The Kihara Institute for Biological Research (横浜市立大学木原生物学研究所, Yokohama Shiritsu Daigaku Kihara Seibutsugaku Kenkyūjo) (KIBR) is an ancillary establishment of Yokohama City University in Yokohama, Japan. The KIBR was founded in 1942 by Hitoshi Kihara to promote biological research in Japan. The institute maintains a store of genetic resources - about 6,000 varieties of wheat and 800 of capsicum (chili peppers).

== Research ==
Although the KIBR's primary focus is plant biology, research there covers a wide variety of biological fields, including biochemistry, cell biology, genetics, informatics, and biotechnology. The results of the research conducted at KIBR are regularly published in peer-reviewed publications.

== Education ==
In addition to being a research institute, the KIBR functions as an institution of higher education, constituting the Graduate School of Nanobioscience, Yokohama City University. The graduate school offers a five-year doctoral program and a two-year master course for university graduates.

== Organization ==
- Department of Plant Genetic Resource (Prof. Tomohiro Ban)
- Department of Plant Genome Science (Prof. Yasunari Ogihara)
- Department of Plant Biotechnology (Prof. Yukihisa Shimada)
- Plant Functional Genomics Research Group (Visiting Prof. Minami Matsui)
- Plant Genomic Network Research Team (Visiting Prof. Motoaki Seki)
- Plant Genome Engineering Research Unit (Visiting Prof. Seiichi Toki)
- Kihara Memorial Room

== History ==
Founded in May 1942 in Kyoto by Hitoshi Kihara, known for the proposal of the genome theory, the KIBR moved to Minami-ku, Yokohama in May 1957. The institute was able to remain open and continue its work throughout the Second World War. It became an ancillary establishment of Yokohama City University in April 1984, and relocated to the Maioka Research Park in Totsuka-ku, Yokohama in December 1994.

On 15 September 2010, the institute was visited by the Emperor of Japan Akihito and Empress Michiko.

== Kihara Memorial Room ==
The Kihara Memorial Room exhibits historical records of Hitoshi Kihara and has been open at the KIBR since 4 March 2010. The opening ceremony was attended by Fumihito, Prince Akishino.

== See also ==
- Kihara Memorial Foundation Academic Award
