= Hitoshi Kihara =

- 木原均
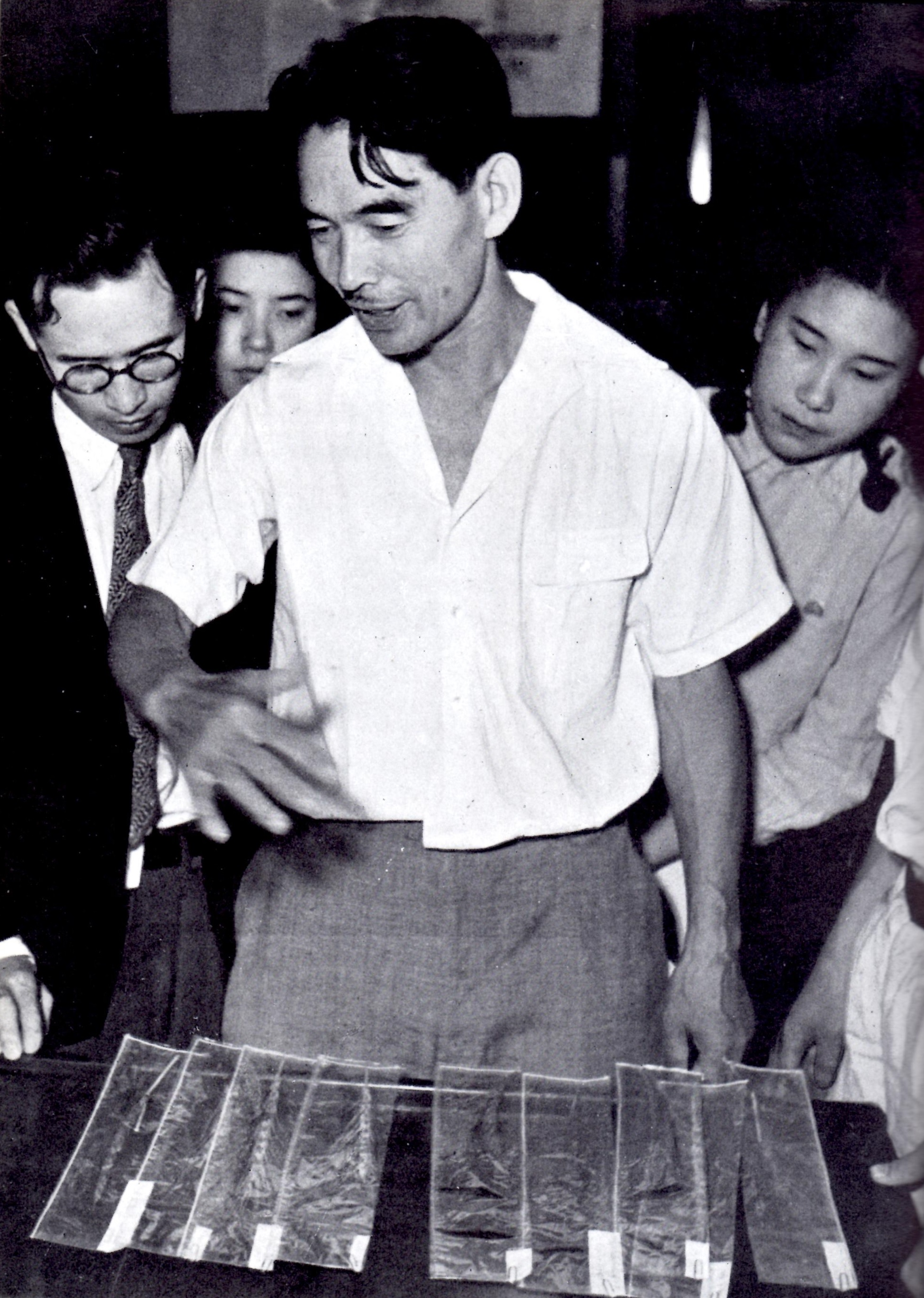
- circa 1950
- Born: 21 October 1893; Tokyo, Empire of Japan
- Died: 27 July 1986 (aged 92)
- Occupations: Geneticist, botanist
- Known for: Fruit and wheat genetics

Academic background
- Education: Kyoto University
- Thesis: Cytologische und genetische Studien bei wichtigen Getreidearten mit besonderer Rucksicht auf das Verhalten der Chromosomen und die Sterilitat in den Bastarden (1924)

Academic work
- Discipline: Genetics
- Sub-discipline: Agriculture
- Institutions: Kihara Institute for Biological Research

Notes
- This infobox contains information translated from the corresponding Japanese Wikipedia article

Hitoshi Kihara (木原 均, Kihara Hitoshi; 21 October 1893 – 27 July 1986) was a Japanese geneticist known for his work on the genetics of wheat and fruits.

== Biography ==
Hitoshi Kihara was born on 21 October 1893 in Tokyo, Japan. He graduated from the Faculty of Agriculture, Hokkaido Imperial University and served as a professor at the Faculty of Agriculture, Kyoto University from 1927 to 1956 and the National Institute of Genetics from 1955 to 1969, and also served at Kihara Institute for Biological Research from 1942 to 1984. He was elected a member of the Japan Academy, the United States National Academy of Sciences, the American Academy of Arts and Sciences, and the American Philosophical Society.

Since 1983, the Genetics Society of Japan (GSJ) has awarded the Kihara Prize to researchers who made a considerable achievement in the field of genetics in honor of Hitoshi Kihara who contributed on a global scale to the field of genetics and study of evolution with his research centering on wheat.

In 1985, the Kihara Memorial Yokohama Foundation for the Advancement of Life Sciences was established in Yokohama, to commemorate Hitoshi Kihara and to promote life sciences.

== Contribution ==
At the time, it was mandatory for a Japanese academic to work overseas for a number of years in order to gain admission as a member of a research faculty. While working in Germany, Hitoshi Kihara studied the genetics of Rumex acetosella and other Sorrel species, and discovered the sex chromosomes. In 1936, he noticed that in wheat seven chromosomes become a pair that performs the lowest gene function, and thus named it a genome. The concept of genomes extended across the world and into biology and genetic engineering developments.

== See also ==
- Kihara Memorial Foundation Academic Award
