= Advanced Medical Research Center =

Japanese research center

YCU Advanced Medical Research Center
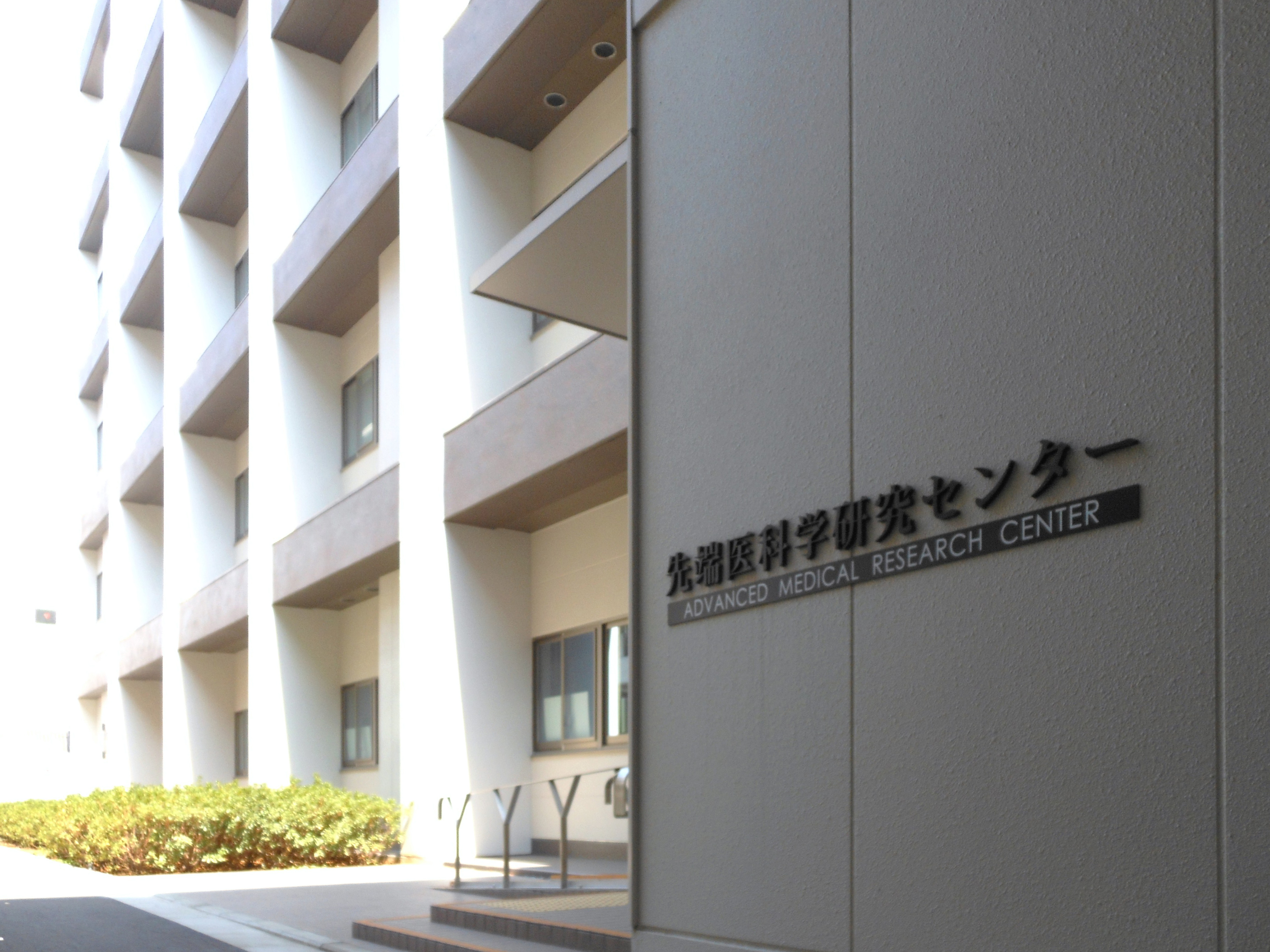
- The Advanced Medical Research Center of YCU
- Established: 2006
- Director: Yukie YAMAGUCHI
- Address: 3-9 Fukuura, 236–0004 Kanazawa-ku, Yokohama, Japan
- Location: Yokohama
- Coordinates: 35.343430°N 139.651487°E
- Interactive map of YCU Advanced Medical Research Center
- Website: www-user.yokohama-cu.ac.jp/~english/index.php/research/amedrc/

The Advanced Medical Research Center (横浜市立大学先端医科学研究センター) (AMRC) is an ancillary establishment of Yokohama City University (YCU) in Kanazawa-ku, Yokohama, Japan. It was established in October 2006, and a new research building at the AMRC was opened on the YCU Fukuura campus in March 2013. The AMRC research building was further enlarged in 2015.

== Research ==
Research at the AMRC covers a wide variety of medical fields, including oncology, immunology, genetics, regenerative medicine, translational research and bioinformatics.

== Organization ==
- Department of Research and Development (Hideki TANIGUCHI)
- Department of Clinical Research Promotion (Yasuo TERAUCHI)
- Department of Research Support and coordination (Takuya TAKAHASHI)
- Biobank Division
- Bioinformatics Laboratory

== Directors ==
- Yukie YAMAGUCHI (current)
- Atsushi NAKAJIMA
- Nobuhiko ORIDATE
- Tomio INOUE
- Hisashi HIRANO
- Shigeo OHNO (2006 to 2008)
