= Ralph E. Comstock =

American geneticist

- Born: Ralph Ernest Comstock; July 19, 1912; Spring Valley, Minnesota
- Died: July 6, 1999 (aged 86); Sun City, Arizona
- Education: University of Minnesota
- Known for: Work in quantitative genetics
- Spouse: Helen Bartel Comstock
- Children: Mary Sue Comstock; John A. Comstock
- Awards: Animal Genetics and Breeding Award from the American Society of Animal Science
- Scientific career
- Fields: Genetics; Statistics
- Institutions: North Carolina State College; University of Minnesota
- Thesis: A study of the sperm cell (1938)

Ralph Ernest Comstock (July 19, 1912 – July 6, 1999) was an American statistician and geneticist known for his work in quantitative genetics.

== Early life and education ==
Comstock was born on July 19, 1912, in Spring Valley, Minnesota. He received his bachelor's, master's, and Ph.D. degrees from the University of Minnesota in 1934, 1936, and 1938, respectively.

== Academic career ==
Comstock joined the faculty of the University of Minnesota in 1937, where he worked as an assistant professor of animal husbandry from then until 1943. On August 15, 1943, he joined the Department of Experimental Statistics at North Carolina State College, where he initially held a simultaneous position in the Department of Animal Science. He continued to serve as an associate professor at North Carolina State College until 1946, when he took a year off to serve as head of the animal husbandry department at Puerto Rico Agricultural Experiment Station. He then returned to the North Carolina State College faculty, where he continued to teach until joining the University of Minnesota in 1957. In 1965, he was named the first head of the University of Minnesota's Department of Genetics; he continued to hold this position until 1968, whereupon he was named a Regents Professor. He was awarded the Animal Genetics and Breeding Award from the American Society of Animal Science in 1966, and retired from the University of Minnesota in 1981. Also in 1981, he was elected a fellow of the American Association for the Advancement of Science.

== Personal life and death ==
Comstock died on July 6, 1999, in Sun City, Arizona. He was survived by his wife, Helen, as well as by their two children and two grandchildren.
