= Japanese University Network in the Bay Area =

The Japanese University Network Bridging the Americas (JUNBA) is a network among Japanese university offices in the Americas. The mission of JUNBA is to assist the enhancement of education and research activities and the creation of new businesses for Japanese universities.

The current core members include the following.

- Fukuoka Institute of Technology
- Japan Society for the Promotion of Science
- J.F. Oberlin University
- Institute of Science Tokyo
- Kagoshima University
- Kobe University
- Kyoto University
- Kyushu University
- Nagoya University
- Okinawa Institute of Science and Technology
- Ryukoku University
- Ritsumeikan University
- Tohoku University
- University of Osaka
- University of Tokyo
- Yokohama City University
- Waseda University

JSPS (Japan Society for the Promotion of Science) San Francisco Office joined as a secretariat office to promote the activities of JUNBA.

JUNBA's mission is to assist Japanese universities, with the enhancement of education and research activities and the creation of new businesses opportunities. JUNBA aims to achieve this mission by facilitating internationalization movements at Japanese universities, supporting the training of university students and personnel, and promoting the development of academia-industry relationships between Japan and the Americas.
