= In vitro spermatogenesis =

In vitro spermatogenesis is the process of creating male gametes (spermatozoa) outside of the body in a culture system. The process could be useful for fertility preservation, infertility treatment and may further develop the understanding of spermatogenesis at the cellular and molecular level.

Spermatogenesis is a highly complex process and artificially rebuilding it in vitro is challenging. These include creating a similar microenvironment to that of the testis as well as supporting endocrine and paracrine signalling, and ensuring survival of the somatic and germ cells from spermatogonial stem cells (SSCs) to mature spermatozoa.

Different methods of culturing can be used in the process such as isolated cell cultures, fragment cultures and 3D cultures.

== Culture techniques ==
=== Isolated cell cultures ===
Cell cultures can include either monocultures, where one cell population is cultured, or co-culturing systems, where several cell lines (must be at least two) can be cultured together. Cells are initially isolated for culture by enzymatically digesting the testis tissue to separate out the different cell types for culture The process of isolating cells can lead to cell damage.

The main advantage of monoculture is that the effect of different influences on one specific cell population of cells can be investigated. Co-culture allows for the interactions between cell populations to be observed and experimented on, which is seen as an advantage over the monoculture model.

Isolated cell culture, specifically co-culture of testis tissue, has been a useful technique for examining the influences of specific factors such as hormones or different feeder cells on the progression of spermatogenesis in vitro. For example, factors such as temperature, feeder cell influence and the role of testosterone and follicle-stimulating hormone (FSH) have all been investigated using isolated cell culture techniques.

Studies have concluded that different factors can influence the culture of germ cells e.g. media, growth factors, hormones and temperature. For example, when culturing immortalized mouse germ cells at temperatures of 35, 37 and 29°C, these cells proliferate most rapidly at the highest temperature and least rapidly at the lowest but there were varying levels of differentiation. At the highest temperature no differentiation were detected, some was seen at 37°C and some early spermatids appearing at 32°C. Isolated cell culture technique has been successfully used for in vitro production of sperm using mouse as an animal model.

Investigations of appropriate feeder cells concluded that a variety of cells could encourage development of germ cells such as Sertoli cells, Leydig cells and peritubular myoid cells but the most essential is Sertoli cells, but Leydig and peritubular myoid cells both contribute to the microenvironment that encourage stem cells to remain pluripotent and self renew in the testis.

=== Testes fragment cultures ===
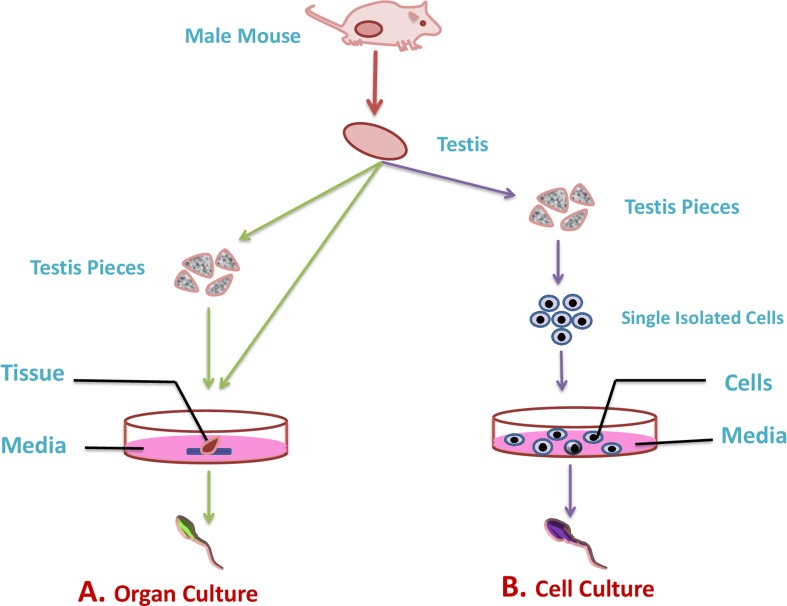
This image shows the difference in process between organ culture and cell culture.

In fragment cultures, the testis is removed and fragments of tissue are cultured in supplemental media containing different growth factors to induce spermatogenesis and form functional gametes. The development of this culture technique has taken place mainly with the use of animal models e.g. mice or rat testis tissue.

The advantage of using this method is that it maintains the natural spatial arrangement of the seminiferous tubules. However, hypoxia is a recurring problem in these cultures where the low oxygen supply hinders the development and maturation of spermatids (significantly more in adult than immature testis tissues). Other challenges with this type of culture include maintaining the structure of the seminiferous tubules which makes it more difficult for longer-term cell cultures as the tissue structures can flatten out making it hard to work with. To resolve some of these issues, 3D cultures can be used.

In 2012, mature spermatozoa capable of fertilization was isolated from in vitro culture of immature mouse testis tissue.

=== 3D cultures ===
3D cultures use sponge, models or scaffolds that resemble the elements of the extracellular matrix to achieve a more natural spatial structure of the seminiferous tubules and to better represent the tissues and the interaction between different cell types in an ex vivo experiment. Different components of the extracellular matrix such as collagen, agar and calcium alginate are commonly used to form the gel or scaffold which can provide oxygen and nutrients. To propagate 3D cultures, testicular cell cultures are imbedded into the porous sponge/scaffold and allowed to colonise the structure which can then survive for several weeks to allow spermatogonia to differentiate and mature into spermatozoa.

In addition, shaking 3D cultures during the seeding process allows for an increased oxygen supply which helps overcome the issue of hypoxia and so improves the lifespan of cells.

In contrast to monocultures, fragment/3D cultures are able to establish in vitro conditions that can somewhat resemble the testicular microenvironment to allow a more accurate study of the testicular physiology and its associations with the in vitro development of sperm cells.

== Future implications ==
=== Scientific ===
The ability to recapitulate spermatogenesis In vitro provides a unique opportunity to study this biological process through oftentimes cheaper and faster method of research than in vivo work. Observation is often easier in vitro, as the targeted cells are mostly isolated and immobile. Another significant advantage of in vitro research is the ease with which environmental factors can be changed and monitored. There are also techniques which are not practical or feasible in vivo which can now be explored.

In vitro work is not without its own challenges. For example, one loses the natural structure provided by the in vivo tissue, and thus cell connections which could be important to the function of the tissue.

=== Clinical ===
While rodent spermatogenesis is not identical to its human counterpart, especially due to the high evolution rate of the male reproductive tract, these techniques are a solid starting point for future human applications.

Various categories of infertile men may benefit from advances in these techniques, especially those with a lack of viable gamete production. These men cannot benefit, for example, from sperm extraction techniques, and currently have little to no options for producing genetic descendants.

Notably, males who have undergone chemo/radiotherapy prepubertally may benefit from in vitro spermatogenesis. These people did not have the option to cryopreserve viable sperm before their procedure, and thus the ability to generate genetically descended sperm later in life is invaluable. Possible methods that could be applied (to this and other groups) are induction of spermatogenesis in testis samples taken prepubertally, or, if these samples are not available/viable, new methods that manipulate stem cell differentiation could produce SSCs 'from scratch', using adult stem cell samples.

An alternative method is to graft preserved tissue back onto adult cancer survivors, however this comes with operational risks, as well as a risk of reintroducing malignant cells. Even if using this method however, in vitro spermatogenesis advances would allow for sample expansion and observation to better ensure quality and quantity of graft tissue.

In those with healthy or preserved SSCs but without a cellular environment to support them, in vitro spermatogenesis could be used following transplant of the SSCs into healthy donor tissue.

Another group that could be helped by in vitro spermatogenesis are those with any form of genetic impediment to sperm production. Those with no viable SSC development are an obvious target, but also those with varying levels of spermatogenic arrest; previously their underdeveloped germ cells have been injected into oocytes, however this has a success rate of only 3% in humans.

Finally, in vitro spermatogenesis using animal or human cells can be used to assess the effects and toxicity of drugs before in vivo testing.
