= H-Invitational =

The H-Invitational

Content
- Description: annotation resource for human genes and transcripts.
- Organisms: Homo sapiens

Contact
- Laboratory: Japan Biological Informatics Consortium
- Primary citation: Yamasaki et al. (2008)
- Release date: 2007

Access
- Website: http://www.h-invitational.jp

the H-Invitational Database (H-InvDB) is a comprehensive annotation resource for human genes and transcripts.

== See also ==
- Genes
