= National Institute of Genetics =

Japanese genetics research institute

Coordinates: 35.117778°N 138.9385°E

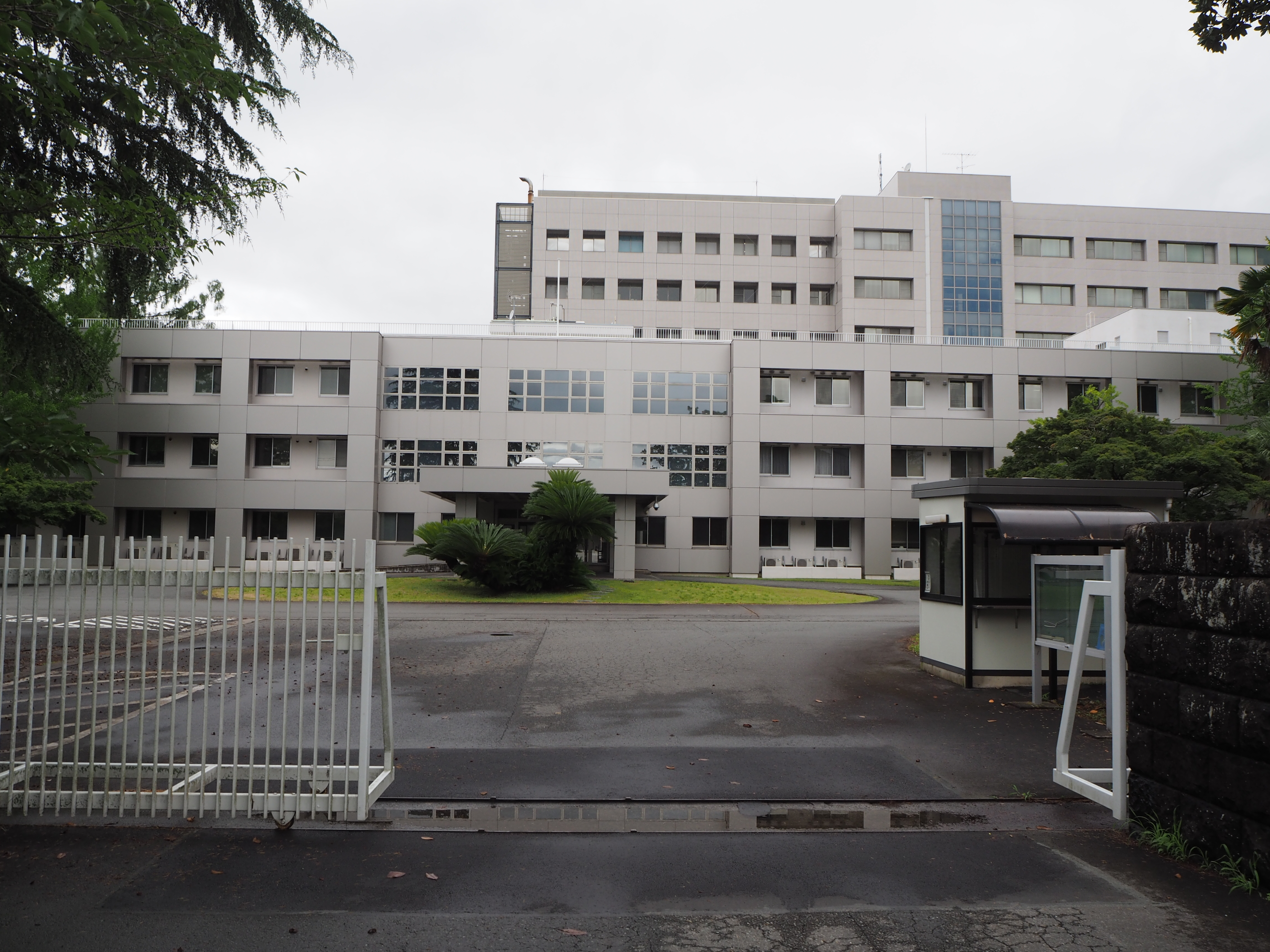
The National Institute of Genetics in Mishima, Shizuoka

The National Institute of Genetics (国立遺伝学研究所) is a Japanese institution founded in 1949. The institute is located in Mishima, Shizuoka.

It hosts the DNA Data Bank of Japan.

It offers 3-year and 5-year (integrated) PhD programs through various admissions routes for both Japanese and foreign students.
