= List of hospitals in Japan =

There were 8,372 hospitals in Japan in October 2018. The largest number of hospitals were in Tokyo with 650 hospitals.

== Aichi ==
=== Nagoya ===
- Aichi Cancer Center Hospital - Chikusa-ku, Nagoya
- Aichi Saiseikai Hospital - Nishi-ku, Nagoya
- Chubu Rosai Hospital - Minato-ku, Nagoya
- Holy Spirit Hospital - Shōwa-ku, Nagoya
- Japan Community Health care Organization Chukyo Hospital - Minami-ku, Nagoya
- Japanese Red Cross Nagoya Daiichi Hospital - Nakamura-ku, Nagoya
- Japanese Red Cross Nagoya Daini Hospital - Shōwa-ku, Nagoya
- Meijo Hospital - Naka-ku, Nagoya
- Meitetsu Hospital - Nishi-ku, Nagoya
- Nagoya City East Medical Center - Chikusa-ku, Nagoya
- Nagoya City University Hospital - Mizuho-ku, Nagoya
- Nagoya City West Medical Center - Kita-ku, Nagoya
- Nagoya Ekisaikai Hospital - Nakagawa-ku, Nagoya
- Nagoya Memorial Hospital - Tempaku-ku, Nagoya
- Nagoya University Hospital - Shōwa-ku, Nagoya
- National Hospital Organization Higashi Nagoya National Hospital - Meitō-ku, Nagoya
- National Hospital Organization Nagoya Medical Center - Naka-ku, Nagoya

=== Others ===
- Aichi Cancer Center Aichi Hospital - Okazaki, Aichi
- Aichi Cardiovascular and Respiratory Center - Ichinomiya, Aichi
- Aichi Children's Health and Medical Center - Ōbu, Aichi
- Aichi Medical University Hospital - Nagakute, Aichi
- Anjo Kosei Hospital - Anjō, Aichi
- Asahi Rosai Hospital - Owariasahi, Aichi
- Atsumi Hospital - Tahara, Aichi
- Bisai Hospital - Inazawa, Aichi
- Chita City Hospital - Chita, Aichi
- Chita Kosei Hospital - Mihama, Aichi
- Daiyukai General Hospital - Ichinomiya, Aichi
- Fujita Health University Hospital - Toyoake, Aichi
- Gamagori City Hospital - Gamagōri, Aichi
- Handa City Hospital - Handa, Aichi
- Hekinan Municipal Hospital - Hekinan, Aichi
- Hospital, National Center for Geriatrics and Gerontrogy - Ōbu, Aichi
- Ichinomiya Municipal Hospital - Ichinomiya, Aichi
- Inazawa City Hospital - Inazawa, Aichi
- Inuyama Chuo General Hospital - Inuyama, Aichi
- Kainan Hospital - Yatomi, Aichi
- Kariya Toyota General Hospital - Kariya, Aichi
- Kasugai Municipal Hospital - Kasugai, Aichi
- Komaki City Hospital - Komaki, Aichi
- Konan Kosei Hospital - Kōnan, Aichi
- Nagoya Tokushukai General Hospital - Kasugai, Aichi
- National Hospital Organization Toyohashi Medical Center - Toyohashi, Aichi
- Toyohashi Municipal Hospital - Toyohashi, Aichi
- Nishio Municipal Hospital - Nishio, Aichi
- Okazaki City Hospital - Okazaki, Aichi
- Shinshiro Municipal Hospital - Shinshiro, Aichi
- Tokoname Municipal Hospital - Tokoname, Aichi
- Tosei General Hospital - Seto, Aichi
- Toyokawa City Hospital - Toyokawa, Aichi
- Toyota Memorial Hospital - Toyota, Aichi
- Toyota Kosei Hospital - Toyota, Aichi
- Tsushima City Hospital - Tsushima, Aichi

== Akita ==
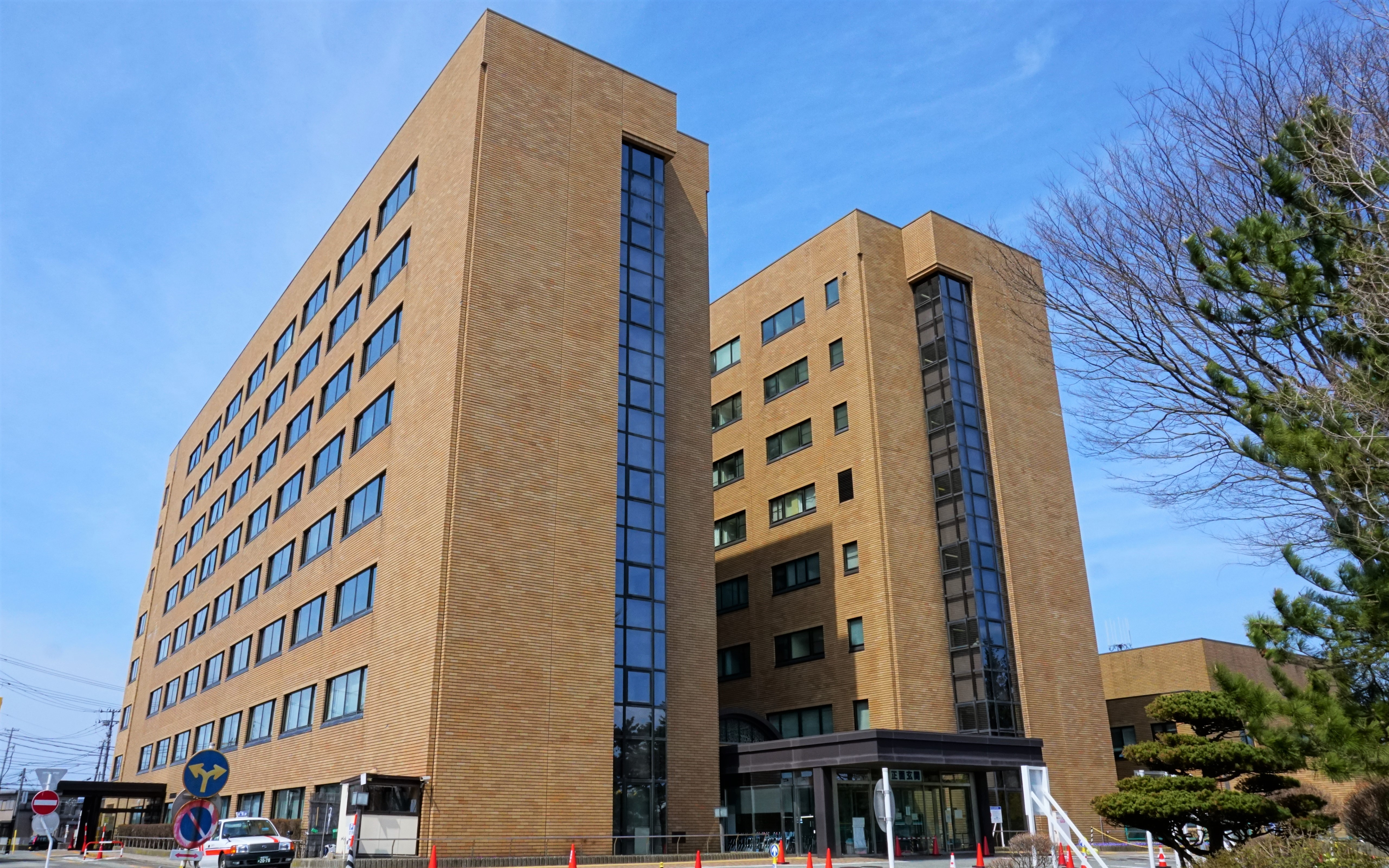
Akita City Hospital

- Akita City Hospital (Japanese Wikipedia) - Akita, Akita
- Akita Kousei Medical Center (Japanese Wikipedia) - Akita, Akita
- Akita Red Cross Hospital (Japanese Wikipedia) - Akita, Akita
- Akita University Hospital (Japanese Wikipedia) - Akita, Akita
- Akita Cerebrospinal and Cardiovascular Center (Japanese Wikipedia) - Akita, Akita
- Nakadori General Hospital (Japanese Wikipedia) - Akita, Akita
- Hiraka General Hospital - Yokote, Akita
- Japan Community Health care Organization Akita Hospital - Noshiro, Akita
- Kakunodate Municipal Hospital - Semboku, Akita
- Kazuno Kosei Hospital - Kazuno, Akita
- Kitaakita Municipal Hospital - Kitaakita, Akita
- National Hospital Organization Akita National Hospital - Yurihonjō, Akita
- Yuri Kumiai General Hospital - Yurihonjō, Akita
- Noshiro Yamamoto Medical Association Hospital - Noshiro, Akita
- Akita Rosai Hospital - Ōdate, Akita
- Odate Municipal General Hospital - Ōdate, Akita
- Ogachi Central Hospital - Yuzawa, Akita
- Omagari Kosei Medical Center - Daisen, Akita
- Yamamoto Kumiai General Hospital - Noshiro, Akita

== Aomori ==
- Aomori City Hospital - Aomori, Aomori
- Aomori Prefectural Central Hospital - Aomori, Aomori
- Aomori Rosai Hospital - Hachinohe, Aomori
- Hachinohe City Hospital - Hachinohe, Aomori
- Hachinohe Red Cross Hospital - Hachinohe, Aomori
- Hirosaki Municipal Hospital - Hirosaki, Aomori
- Hirosaki University Hospital - Hirosaki, Aomori
- Kuroishi General Hospital - Kuroishi, Aomori
- Misawa Municipal Misawa Hospital - Misawa, Aomori
- Mutsu General Hospital - Mutsu, Aomori
- National Hospital Organization Aomori National Hospital - Aomori, Aomori
- National Hospital Organization Hachinohe National Hospital - Hachinohe, Aomori
- National Hospital Organization Hirosaki National Hospital - Hirosaki, Aomori
- Towada City Hospital - Towada, Aomori
- Tsugaru General Hospital - Goshogawara, Aomori

== Chiba ==
=== Chiba City ===
- Chiba Aoba Municipal Hospital - Chūō-ku, Chiba
- Chiba Cancer Center - Chūō-ku, Chiba
- Chiba Children's Hospital - Midori-ku, Chiba
- Chiba Emergency Medical Center - Mihama-ku, Chiba
- Chiba Kaihin Municipal Hospital - Mihama-ku, Chiba
- Chiba University Hospital - Chūō-ku, Chiba
- National Hospital Organization Chiba-East-Hospital - Chūō-ku, Chiba
- National Hospital Organization Chiba Medical Center - Chūō-ku, Chiba
- The Research Center Hospital for Charged Particle Therapy of the National Institute of Radiological Sciences - Inage-ku, Chiba

=== Others ===
- Awa Regional Medical Center - Tateyama, Chiba
- Chiba Cerebral and Cardiovascular Center - Ichihara, Chiba
- Chibaken Saiseikai Narashino Hospital - Narashino, Chiba
- Chiba-Nishi General Hospital - Matsudo, Chiba
- Chiba Prefectural Sawara Hospital - Katori, Chiba
- Chiba Prefectural Togane Hospital - Tōgane, Chiba
- Chiba Rosai Hospital - Ichihara, Chiba
- Funabashi Municipal Medical Center - Funabashi, Chiba
- General Hospital National Health Asahi Central Hospital - Asahi, Chiba
- Japan Community Health care Organization Funabashi Central Hospital - Funabashi, Chiba
- The Jikei University Kashiwa Hospital - Kashiwa, Chiba
- Juntendo University Urayasu Hospital - Urayasu, Chiba
- Kameda General Hospital - Kamogawa, Chiba
- Kimitsu Chuo Hospital - Kisarazu, Chiba
- Kohnodai Hospital, National Center for Global Health and Medicine - Ichikawa, Chiba
- Matsudo City Hospital - Matsudo, Chiba
- Narita Red Cross Hospital - Narita, Chiba
- National Cancer Center Hospital East - Kashiwa, Chiba
- National Hospital Organization Shimoshizu National Hospital - Yotsukaidō, Chiba
- Nippon Medical School Chiba Hokusoh Hospital - Inzai, Chiba
- Teikyo University Chiba Medical Center - Ichihara, Chiba
- Tokyo Dental College Ichikawa General Hospital - Ichikawa, Chiba
- Tokyo Women's Medical University Yachiyo Medical Center - Yachiyo, Chiba

== Ehime ==
- Ehime Prefectural Central Hospital - Matsuyama, Ehime
- Ehime Prefectural Imabari Hospital - Imabari, Ehime
- Ehime Prefectural Minamiuwa Hospital - Ainan, Ehime
- Ehime Prefectural Niihama Hospital - Niihama, Ehime
- Ehime Rosai Hospital - Niihama, Ehime
- Ehime University Hospital - Tōon, Ehime
- Matsuyama Red Cross Hospital - Matsuyama, Ehime
- National Hospital Organization Ehime Medical Center - Tōon, Ehime
- National Hospital Organization Shikoku Cancer Center - Matsuyama, Ehime
- Saijo Central Hospital - Saijō, Ehime
- Saijo City Shuso Hospital - Saijō, Ehime
- Saiseikai Imabari Hospital - Imabari, Ehime
- Saiseikai Saijo Hospital - Saijō, Ehime
- Shikoku Central Hospital of the Mutual Aid Association of Public School teachers - Shikokuchūō, Ehime
- Sumitomo Besshi Hospital - Niihama, Ehime
- Uwajima City Hospital - Uwajima, Ehime
- Uwajima Tokushukai Hospital - Uwajima, Ehime
- Yawatahama City General Hospital - Yawatahama, Ehime

== Fukui ==
- Fukui General Hospital - Fukui, Fukui
- Fukui-ken Saiseikai Hospital - Fukui, Fukui
- Fukui Kosei Hospital - Fukui, Fukui
- Fukui Prefectural Hospital - Fukui, Fukui
- Fukui Red Cross Hospital - Fukui, Fukui
- Japan Community Health care Organization Fukui Katsuyama General Hospital - Katsuyama, Fukui
- Municipal Tsuruga Hospital - Tsuruga, Fukui
- National Hospital Organization Awara Hospital - Awara, Fukui
- National Hospital Organization Fukui National Hospital - Tsuruga, Fukui
- Sugita Genpaku Memorial Obama Municipal Hospital - Obama, Fukui
- Tannan Regional Medical Center - Sabae, Fukui
- University of Fukui Hospital - Eiheiji, Fukui

== Fukuoka ==
- Self-Defense Forces Fukuoka Hospital - Kasuga, Fukuoka

== Fukushima ==
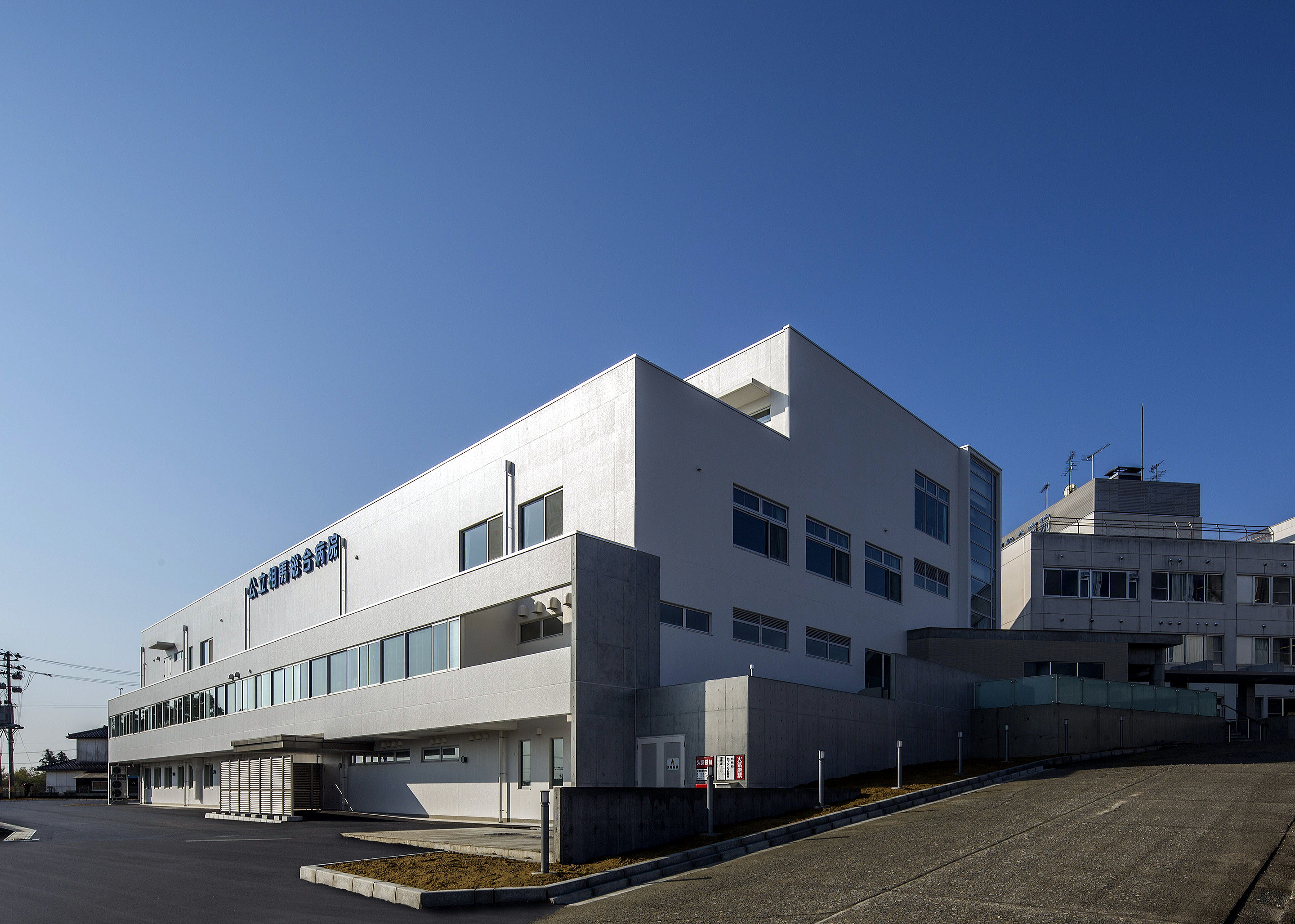
Soma General Hospital

- Soma General Hospital, Sōma, Fukushima

== Gifu ==
- National Hospital Organization Nagara Medical Center - Gifu, Gifu
- Kizawa Memorial Hospital - Gifu, Gifu
- Self-Defense Forces Gifu Hospital - Kakamigahara, Gifu

== Gunma ==
- Gunma University Hospital - Maebashi, Gunma
- Kuryu Rakusen-en Sanatorium - Kusatsu Otsu Kusatsu, Gunma
- Shibukawa General Hospital - Shibukawa, Gunma
- Shibukawa Chuo Hospital - Shibukawa, Gunma
- Nishi-Gunma Hospital - Shibukawa, Gunma
- Sekiguchi Hospital - Shibukawa, Gunma
- Sakadiku Hospital - Shibukawa, Gunma

== Hiroshima ==
- Self-Defense Forces Kure Hospital - Kure, Hiroshima
- Takashitu Kure Hospital - Kure, Hiroshima
- Shima Hospital - Hiroshima, Hiroshima

== Hokkaidō ==
- East Otaru hospital - Otaru, Hokkaido
- Higashi Otaru Hospital - Otaru, Hokkaido
- Municipal Otaru hospital (Japanese Wikipedia) - Otaru, Hokkaido
- South Otaru hospital - Otaru, Hokkaido
- Self-Defense Forces Sapporo Hospital - Sapporo, Hokkaido

== Hyōgo ==
- Hyogo Emergency Medical Center - Kobe, Hyogo
- Japanese Red Cross Kobe Hospital - Kobe, Hyogo
- Kobe Adventist Hospital - Kobe, Hyogo
- Kobe City Medical Center General Hospital - Kobe, Hyogo
- Kobe University Hospital - Kobe, Hyogo
- Hyogo Prefectural Kakogawa Medical Center - Kakogawa, Hyogo
- Nishiwaki Municipal Hospital - Nishiwaki, Hyogo
- Hyogo Prefectural Harima-Himeji General Medical Center - Himeji, Hyogo
- Japanese Red Cross Society Himeji Hospital - Himeji, Hyogo
- National Hospital Organization Himeji Medical Center - Himeji, Hyogo
- Self-Defense Forces Hanshin Hospital - Kawanishi, Hyogo
- Takarazuka City Hospital - Takarazuka, Hyogo
- Hyogo Prefectural Awaji Medical Center - Sumoto, Hyogo
- Ako City Hospital - Ako, Hyogo

== Kagoshima ==
- Amami Wakoen Sanatorium
- Hoshizuka Keiaien Sanatorium
- Kagoshima City Hospital

== Kanagawa ==
=== Yokohama ===
- Bluff Hospital, Naka-ku, Yokohama
- Kanagawa Children's Medical Center - Minami-ku, Yokohama
- Kanagawa Cancer Center - Asahi-ku, Yokohama
- Yokohama City University Hospital - Kanazawa-ku, Yokohama
- Yokohama City University Medical Center - Minami-ku, Yokohama
- Yokohama Rosai Hospital - Kōhoku-ku, Yokohama

=== Others ===
- Fujisawa City Hospital - Fujisawa, Kanagawa
- Kanagawa Dental University Hospital - Yokosuka, Kanagawa
- Odawara Municipal Hospital - Odawara, Kanagawa
- Self-Defense Forces Yokosuka Hospital - Yokosuka, Kanagawa

== Kumamoto ==
- Kikuchi Keifuen Sanatorium - Kohshi-shi, Kumamoto
- Self-Defense Forces Kumamoto Hospital - Kumamoto

== Kyoto ==
=== Kyoto City ===
- Kyoto City Hospital
- Kyoto University Hospital
- National Hospital Organization Kyoto Medical Center
- Japanese Red Cross Society Kyoto Daiichi Hospital
- University Hospital, Kyoto Prefectural University of Medicine
- Rakuwakai Otowa Hospital

=== Others ===
- Self-Defense Forces Maizuru Hospital - Maizuru, Kyoto
- Saiseikai Kyoto Hospital - Nagaokakyō, Kyoto
- North Medical Center Kyoto Prefectural University of Medicine - Yosano, Kyoto
- Fukuchiyama City Hospital - Fukuchiyama, Kyoto
- Kyoto Chubu Medical Center - Nantan, Kyoto
- Uji Tokushukai Hospital - Uji, Kyoto
- Kyoto Okamoto Memorial Hospital - Kumiyama, Kyoo

== Mie ==
- Mie University Hospital - Tsu, Mie

== Miyagi ==
- Self-Defense Forces Sendai Hospital - Sendai, Miyagi

== Miyazaki ==
- Junwakai Memorial Hospital, Miyazaki
- Miyazaki Prefectural Miyazaki Hospital, Miyazaki
- National Hospital Organization Miyazaki East Hospital, Miyazaki
- Nobeoka Hospital, Nobeoka

== Nagano ==
- Aizawa Hospital, Matsumoto
- Asahi Nagano Hospital, Nagano
- East Nagano Hospital, Nagano
- Iida Municipal Hospital, Iida
- Kamiyamada Hospital, Nagano
- Matsumoto Medical Center, Matsumoto
- Nagano Chūō Hospital, Nagano
- Nagano Matsushiro General Hospital, Nagano
- Nagano Municipal Hospital, Nagano
- Shinonoi General Hospital, Nagano
- Shinshu University Hospital, Matsumoto

== Nagasaki ==
- Self-Defense Forces Sasebo Hospital - Sasebo, Nagasaki

== Niigata ==
- Kido Hospital, Niigata
- Kuwana Hospital, Niigata
- Nagaoka Chūō General Hospital, Nagaoka
- Niigata Central Hospital, Niigata
- Niigata Medical Centre, Niigata
- Niigata University Medical and Dental Hospital, Niigata

== Ōita ==
- Self-Defense Forces Beppu Hospital - Beppu, Oita

== Okayama ==
- Oyama Shimin Byoin Hospital

== Okinawa ==
- Self-Defense Forces Naha Hospital - Naha, Okinawa
- Adventist Medical Center-Okinawa - Nishihara, Okinawa

== Osaka ==
=== Osaka City ===
- National Hospital Organization Osaka National Hospital - Chuo-ku, Osaka
- Osaka International Cancer Institute - Chuo-ku, Osaka
- Osaka Metropolitan University Hospital - Abeno-ku, Osaka
- Osaka City General Hospital - Miyakojima-ku, Osaka
- Osaka Dental University Hospital - Chuo-ku, Osaka
- Osaka General Medical Center - Sumiyoshi-ku, Osaka
- Osaka Red Cross Hospital - Tennōji-ku, Osaka
- Osaka Police Hospital - Tennōji-ku, Osaka
- St. Barnabas' Hospital - Tennōji-ku, Osaka
- Tane General Hospital - Nishi-ku, Osaka
- Yodogawa Christian Hospital - Higashisumiyoshi-ku, Osaka

=== Others ===
- Osaka University Hospital - Suita, Osaka
- Saiseikai Senri Hospital - Suita, Osaka
- Osaka Medical College Hospital - Takatsuki, Osaka
- Kansai Medical University Medical Center - Moriguchi, Osaka
- Kansai Medical University Hospital - Hirakata, Osaka
- Higashiosaka City Medical Center - Higashiosaka, Osaka
- Osaka Prefectural Nakakawachi Medical Center of Acute Medicine - Higashiosaka, Osaka
- Kindai University Hospital - Osakasayama, Osaka
- Sakai City Medical Center - Sakai, Osaka
- Rinku General Medical Center - Izumisano, Osaka
- Senshu Trauma and Critical Care Center - Izumisano, Osaka

== Shimane ==
- Shimane University Hospital - Izumo, Shimane

== Shizuoka ==
- Koyama Fukusei Hospital - Gotemba, Shizuoka
- Self-Defense Forces Fuji Hospital - Oyama, Shizuoka

== Tochigi ==
- Sano Kosei General Hospital - Sano, Tochigi
- Ashikaga Red Cross Hospital - Ashikaga, Tochigi

== Tokyo ==
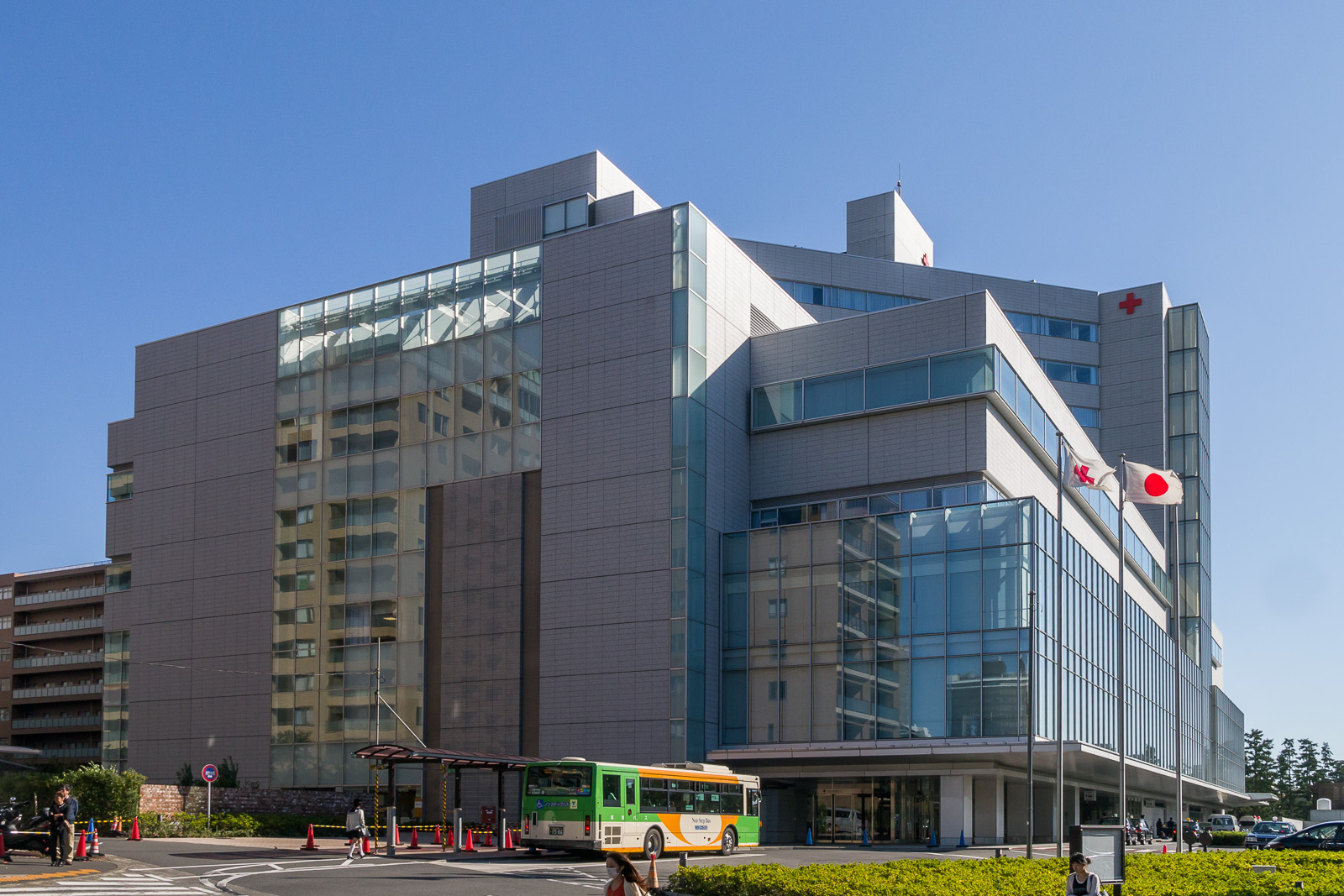
Japanese Red Cross Medical Center in Tokyo

- Center for the Mentally and Physically Handicapped
- Ebara Hospital
- Institute of Science Tokyo Hospital
- International Catholic Hospital (Seibo Hospital)
- Japanese Red Cross Medical Center, Hiroo, Shibuya
- Jikei University School of Medicine Hospital
- Juntendo Hospital
- Keio University Hospital
- National Cancer Center
- National Hospital Organization Tokyo Medical Center
- Nippon Medical School Hospital
- NTT Medical Center Tokyo
- Ohkubo Hospital
- Self-Defense Forces Central Hospital, Setagaya
- St. Luke's International Hospital
- Tama-Hokubu Medical Centre
- Tama-Nanbu Chiiki Hospital
- Tobu Chiiki Hospital
- Tokyo Adventist Hospital
- Tokyo Medical University Hospital
- Tokyo Metropolitan Bokutoh Hospital
- Tokyo Metropolitan Children's Medical Centre
- Tokyo Metropolitan Hiroo Hospital, Shibuya
- Tokyo Metropolitan Komagome Hospital
- Tokyo Metropolitan Matsuzawa Hospital
- Tokyo Metropolitan Neurological Hospital
- Tokyo Metropolitan Ohtsuka Hospital
- Tokyo Metropolitan Tama Medical Centre
- Toshima Hospital
- University of Tokyo Hospital

== Yamagata ==
- Nihonkai General Hospital, Sakata
- Okitama Public General Hospital, Nagai
- Shonai Hospital, Tsuruoka
- Yamagata City Hospital Saiseikan, Yamagata
- Yamagata Prefectural Shinjo Hospital, Shinjō
- Yamagata Tokushukai Hospital, Yamagata
- Yonezawa Municipal Hospital, Yonezawa

== Yamaguchi ==
- Nagato General Hospital
- National Hospital Organization Iwakuni Clinical Centre
- Shimonoseki City Hospital
- Yamaguchi Prefecture Saiseikai Yamaguchi General Hospital

== Yamanashi ==
- Kofu Municipal Hospital
- University of Yamanashi Hospital
- Yamanashi Prefectural Central Hospital
- Yamanashi Red Cross Hospital
