= Yasuo Yamada =

Japanese actor (1932–1995)

- 山田 康雄
- Yamada in 1962
- Born: 10 September 1932; Tokyo City, Tokyo Prefecture, Japan
- Died: 19 March 1995 (aged 62); Ebara Hospital, Tokyo, Japan
- Resting place: Tama Cemetery, Tokyo, Japan
- Occupations: Actor; voice actor; narrator
- Years active: 1953–1995
- Agent: Theater Echo
- Known for: Arsène Lupin III (Lupin III)
- Height: 167 cm (5 ft 6 in)

Yasuo Yamada (山田 康雄, Yamada Yasuo; 10 September 1932 – 19 March 1995) was a Japanese actor, voice actor and narrator.

His most well known and famous role was portraying Arsène Lupin III in the Lupin III series from 1971 to 1995. He was also the official Japanese dubbing voice actor of Clint Eastwood and Jean-Paul Belmondo.

== Early life ==
Yamada was born in Tokyo, Japan. Coming from a family of government officials, Yamada's father worked for the Bank of Japan, but died when Yamada was three years old. After that, he was raised by his mother.

In 1945, Yamada entered the prestigious Tokyo Metropolitan Hibiya High School. While in school, he was passionate about baseball, but he also loved movies and even took time off from classes to go to the cinema. One day, he was attracted to Danny Kaye's comical performance in the comedy film The Secret Life of Walter Mitty (1947), and began to yearn to be a comedic actor who could perform comedies that amuse others.

When Yamada took the university entrance examination, he applied to the University of Tokyo. His reason for applying, according to him, was that it was "the only university in the Tokyo Big6 Baseball League where the level is low and you can get regular playing time.". and he was not accepted. However, his grades at the time of graduation were relatively good, so it was not necessarily a reckless challenge.

== Career ==
=== Early career ===
Yamada began his career after entering the School of Letters at Waseda University, where he joined a theater club.

In 1953, Yamada passed the examination for the Mingei Theatre Company, which was said to be the most difficult theater company in Japan at the time, and dropped out of college to join the company as a research student. However, he could not do the comedy he wanted to do and could not endure the rigorous basic training every day, so he left the company after one year and became a freelancer.

After turning freelance, Yamada appeared on radio and television through acquaintances. In 1958, Kazuo Kumakura, with whom he had worked on several programs, invited him to join the Theater Echo, a theatrical troupe that focused on comedy, and he made his first stage appearance.

=== 1958-1990s ===
Theatre Echo was poor at the time, and in order to fund its operations, the company members took on voice acting jobs on the side, and Yamada was asked to do voice acting soon after joining the company. Yamada was asked to dub for Gary Merrill, who stars in the Alfred Hitchcock Presents episode "The Manacled". However, Yamada, who had been given the lead role immediately after joining the troupe and had an inflated ego, gave 5 NGs during rehearsals at the recording studio due to his inexperience in acting, and was eventually dropped from the role just before the performance after the staff criticized his performance. Yamada felt frustrated at this time and at the same time reflected on the fact that he had been very naive in his thinking. The next day, he made a fresh start, went back to his roots, and started rehearsing the play from the basics, which he continued to do with great desperation.

In 1959, he made his debut as a voice actor when he was selected by audition to dub for Clint Eastwood's Roddy in "Rawhide". The film was a hit, and Yamada became so famous that the public recognized him as "Yasuo Yamada who dubbed for Clint Eastwood," and this was the beginning of his career as a voice actor. Thereafter, Yamada did both voice acting and stage work at the same time. At Theater Echo he became a signature actor, appearing in performances of plays by Hisashi Inoue. In addition to Clint Eastwood, Yamada would also dub for Jean-Paul Belmondo. In animation, he was cast as Lupin III in 1971, a role he played for 23 1/2 years until his death, becoming his life's work. He also worked as a TV personality, hosting the comedian audition program "Comedy Star Birth! (お笑いスター誕生!)", and appeared in many TV shows.

From the 1980s, his work as a TV personality and narrator increased, and other than narration, the majority of his voice acting work consisted of reprising his roles or one-offs. He had been away from stage work since 1978 due to his busy schedule, and although he expressed a desire to return several times, this was ultimately his last appearance (Including his voice, his last stage was "The Sunshine Boys" in 1984.).

=== Later years ===
In 1994, Yamada was hospitalized for hypokalemia. From around this time, he became ill and was repeatedly hospitalized and discharged due to difficulty walking. More and more recordings in his later years were done sitting down. On February 17, 1995, he collapsed at home due to a brain hemorrhage and was transferred to Hospital. His family tended to him every day, but Yamada's condition suddenly changed after the withdrawal on the night of March 18, and he died on March 19 at the age of 62. His ashes are buried in Tama Cemetery.

== Personal life and character ==
Yamada was known for his cheerful and jovial personality, often cracking jokes and sarcastic remarks to make others laugh. On the other hand, he also has a shy and serious side, and during interviews, he could be seen candidly expressing his own opinions about his performance and work while bashfully stating them. His way of life was regarded as a pursuit of "Iki (粋)", and he himself has made statements that are seen as affirming this.

He joked in an interview that he became an actor so he could oversleep.

Yamada married in 1965 and has one son and one daughter. However, due to Yamada's strong desire not to reveal his personal life, his family did not appear in the media at all, and their names were only revealed at his funeral. Note that only the eldest son has since become a writer of rakugo and other forms of entertainment, and his name is credited on several TV programs.

=== Beliefs ===
"Things don't work out that well in this world anyway. So let's just laugh it off and live a happy life. A life of puns is the best life for me!"

— Yasuo Yamada

His favorite word is "If I had to say, 'freedom'", and his motto is "To have no convictions". Yamada said, "One never knows how long one will live. I hate the act of holding a silly belief and presenting it off to the people around me as if it intimidates them."

Yamada was assertive, but avoided direct interference with personal values and preferences. Yamada commented, "I am not a child either. I can speak out to please my fans like an honor student. But if I keep doing that, I will feel suffocated, and eventually I will be crushed. The world is made up of people with different ways of thinking. That's fine. It is dangerous if everyone thinks the same way. It opens the way to Fascism. I don't interfere with others no matter what they think. That is the absolute condition for protecting my freedom".

He preferred comedies. According to him, "I love doing silly things that don't add up to anything, and I love doing them hard".

Yamada had a strict work ethic that sometimes made his co-stars tense in the on-site recording studio. He would also become furious and walk out of the studio when things did not make sense with the staff, but all of this was done to represent the feelings of the performers, and he was respected by many of his peers.

Yamada, who also valued acting, thoroughly adhered to his stance that "there is no independent profession called 'voice actor,' and that 'voice acting' is one of the various jobs an 'actor' does". Also, He said, "An actor does not play a role but manipulates the role," and all acting was done in his natural voice.

== Clint Eastwood ==
Yamada was also the official Japanese dubbing voice actor of Clint Eastwood.

The beginning of it goes back to Rawhide, a career breakthrough Eastwood has long sought. Yamada dubbed Eastwood's Rudy Yates in this Western series. This was a huge success, and fans have come to call it "Eastwood's voice is Yamada," and its fame continues to this day. There were times when another person dubbed Eastwood, but most of the work was later redo dubbed by Yamada due to many protests from fans saying "Eastwood's voice is strange."

Yamada has often said in interviews since the 1970s. "In Rawhide, Eastwood was a naïve young man, and I was young and just starting out, so it was a natural fit. But after A Fistful of Dollars, he became more and more of a masculine actor, while I became more of a lightweight comedian kind of actor. To be clear, I don't think my Eastwood dubbing I do now is the best." Also, Yamada's voice and Eastwood's voice are very different, but he said that this is a matter of habituation.

But there are episodes like this. For the dubbed version of White Hunter Black Heart, a new translator created the script. However, when Yamada read it, he told the translator, "He wouldn't talk like that!" and immediately rejected the script.(According to co-star Shuichi Ikeda, there was nothing unnatural about the script, but he remarked, "Since Mr. Yamada said so, it must have been true.") also, In an interview, Yamada himself said, "Unlike other dubbings, I feel relieved when I see Eastwood on the screen during recording." "There is something different from likes and dislikes and characters."

Yamada and Eastwood met only once by the cast of Rawhide came to Japan in 1962. At this time, Yamada and Eastwood worked together for several days. Yamada talked about this memory in 1987. "He was a very good young man at that time, and he had a shy and naive atmosphere. At that time, I didn't think he would be a manly actor like he is now." In addition, Yamada carefully preserved the autographed colored paper presented by Eastwood at this time as a "lifelong treasure". and said that the two had been Exchange letters for a while after returning to Japan.

After Yamada died at the end of the dubbing of A Perfect World, various people dubbed Eastwood, but none of them became popular and did not take root. But in 2009 that will change. There was a scene where Yamada was not dubbed in For a Few Dollars More, and Yōhei Tadano was dubbed as a substitute for Yamada in the DVD release. Tadano was a junior member of the theater company to which Yamada belonged, and his acting and voice were very similar to those of Yamada. After this, Tadano was dubbed in several works as a replacement for Yamada, and began dubbing Eastwood from The Mule. In an interview, Tadano said, "Eastwood's acting is important, but I acting with 100% respect for Mr. Yamada."

== Lupin III ==
Yamada's most famous role was that of Arsène Lupin III in the Lupin III anime franchise, whom he voiced from 1971 until his death in 1995.

He appeared in many TV shows as a TV personality, and his voice, speech, and even his appearance were similar to Lupin's, making him a prominent example of the identification of the actor and the character in Japan.

=== Casting ===
"I didn't know there was such a wonderful manga in Japan !" I was surprised. It is not a Manga, but a "Japan comics" in contrast to "American comics". I liked the fast tempo, the pleasant rhythm, overflowing gag, the leaps and bounds that would make a serious person angry, and above all, the fact that it was not about a righteous bandit. I was captivated by the work.

— In 1989, Yamada recalled his thoughts when he first read the original story by Monkey Punch.

In 1969, Yamada was cast in the stage production of The Japanese Navel (日本人のへそ). However, the script by Hisashi Inoue was something that could not be handled by established acting techniques, and he was very troubled by the role. Then, the director gave Yamada a clipping of the original story of "Lupin III" by Monkey Punch, which was published in a magazine at the time, saying that it would be helpful. At first, Yamada thought, "It's outrageous that reading Manga is your advice to me", but once he started reading it, he was immediately attracted to the content and became hooked. After that, he began to buy "Lupin" magazines, and at the same time, he incorporated the "essence" of Lupin in the manga into his own roles.

Then, on the day of the stage performance, Masaaki Osumi, who happened to be looking for a voice actor for Lupin, was in the audience that day. Osumi was so fascinated by Yamada's performance that he felt as if "Lupin were alive right in front of his eyes". After the performance, Osumi immediately approached Yamada even though he had never met him before. When Yamada heard Osumi's proposal, he replied, "I'll do it!" and he immediately accepted the offer to appear in the series without even going through an agent.

=== Episode ===
His free-spiritedness and lack of conviction, his not a righteous bandit, and his "aimlessness is purpose" in that if something seems impossible to steal, he will act with all his might to steal it, even if it is worthless, are 3 aspects of his character that I particularly like about him.

— Yasuo Yamada

Yamada was deemed by director Osumi to be "already established in the role" and finished recording without passing a single discussion from the Part 1 of the Lupin series.

In Part 2 of the Lupin series, which was originally intended for "adult audiences," the broadcasters, who were concerned about viewer ratings, increasingly made the series more kid-friendly, which Yamada felt resulted in a lower quality finish than in the past. While Yamada was frustrated by this, he and the rest of the cast struggled to make the finished product bearable for adult viewers with the performers. This and other events led Yamada to gradually reflect his own personality in Lupin, including improvisational acting and his unique accent and turns of phrase. In particular, the unique intonation of foojiko-chan (ふ〜じこちゃ〜ん) when calling Fujiko Mine and Lupiin-saanseee (ルパ〜ンさ〜んせ〜) when Lupin calls himself were recognized by the public as synonymous with Lupin, and were also used in subsequent series. Also, The phrase "Arararara...", which Lupin uses when he is surprised, was also invented by him. He incorporated this exclamation into the Japanese dub of Monty Python's Flying Circus as well.

Yamada sometimes made jokes or showed a lack of motivation before entering the studio, but once in the studio, he was so focused on the role that his co-stars thought he was "pouring everything he had into Lupin," and never made a mistake. Yamada's concentration on the scene was so strong that it made everyone around him feel tense.

Yamada's favorite film was "The Castle of Cagliostro". Recording days, director Hayao Miyazaki asked Yamada, "I want you to change the way you act from what you normally do, to give it the feel of when you dubbed Clint Eastwood". Yamada initially responded, "I don't want to be told a lot of things now. After all, I should just play the role as usual, right? I'll decide what to do with Lupin, so leave it to me!" Yamada showed a very arrogant attitude. However, when he saw the video at the rehearsal, his demeanor changed drastically. He approached Miyazaki and said, "Mr. Miyazaki. I apologize for my very rude remarks earlier. Please tell me whatever difficult order you have. I will play your ideal Lupin, even if I have to do it over a hundred times!" There is an anecdote that he apologized. Yamada had come to take pride in his role in Part 2 of the series, thinking, "We are taking a low-quality film and making it interesting with the help of our cast.". In that context, When he saw the high quality of Miyazaki's work, he was so impressed that he gave the biggest compliment: "What they are doing is, as usual, ridiculous, but the images are clear and meticulous in their attention to detail. This film is very stylish. And, I think this film is the essence of the work 'Lupin III'.", and "Hooray for Mr. Miyazaki."

The original author, Monkey Punch, said of Yamada's Lupin: "'Lupin III' is certainly a comic I drew, but it is only the world of the printed book and not yet completed. In this respect, it was Yasuo Yamada who completed the animated version of 'Lupin III' as a work. The character's unique personality, movements, speech, and strong presence could not have been created without Mr. Yamada." He also highly praised him.

Makio Inoue, who played the role of Goemon Ishikawa XIII for many years, said of Yamada's Lupin, "He was the one on whom the director depended. His presence was beyond the realm of a typical voice actor", he said in his assessment. As for the script, everyone began to write the script with the basic premise that Yamada would play Lupin, and gradually the character of Lupin itself began to be written to resemble Yamada. In addition, the dialogue and animation also changed so that they were drawn with Yamada's tempo in mind.

Toshio Furukawa, who has played Lupin only once, said that even though he tried to play his own unique Lupin in the recording, he inadvertently imitated Yamada. He said "Despite being played by a different person, as soon as you see the character, you subconsciously let yourself be imitated. This is as great as a living national treasure as an actor.".

Yamada had a very strong attachment to Lupin, stating that "there is almost no difference in the way he lives and thinks." and "The character Lupin in the original comic was created by Mr.Monkey Punch and is his alone, but the Lupin in the anime is mine because he was created by the other staff and myself. You can think of him in the anime as being identical to me. (Note: Yamada said, "When a book work is made into a video, not just an anime, it leaves the hands of the original author. But because there is a great original work, we can break it down and develop it." He also pays tribute to Monkey Punch.)", and inserting an illustration of Lupin on his business card. He also said, "An actor is happy if he meets a role that fits him perfectly even once before he dies, but I was able to meet such a great character and it became a popular work. I have nothing more to say.". After Lupin's popularity took hold, Yamada decided that the only anime he would appear in from now on would be Lupin, and he began to decline requests to appear in other anime.

=== The Eternal Lupin III ===
If I am no longer able to perform, I would like you to stop making new Lupin series, whether for a TV station or a movie company. I'm sorry to say this, but I want him to grow old with me, and when I die, I want to take him with me to my grave. I have that kind of feeling.

— Yamada made these comments in a 1989 interview.

In the late 1980s, Yamada began interacting with Kanichi Kurita. Kurita appeared on TV shows as Impressionist, and "impersonating Lupin" was one of his repertoire of impersonation. Yamada once said, "I'm not going to say that," as Kurita performed his impersonation of Lupin on the show, and then made a surprise appearance as the "real Lupin" to enliven the audience.

In 1993, during the postrecording of the "Lupin III: Voyage to Danger" Yamada looked very tired during a break and volunteered to sit in a chair during the recording. This was extremely unusual, as he had never recorded while sitting down before, out of pride as a former stage actor. At that time, Yamada apologized to his co-stars and left the studio, feeling extremely depressed. Later, due to his physical condition, he began to record while sitting in a chair or wheelchair. Around the same time, he began calling Yuji Ohno, who had composed music for Lupin and with whom he had released a CD album, "Let's make the next album soon. If you don't, I'll die". Yamada also began to act as if he realized his own mortality on several other occasions.

In January 1995, Yamada was selected to appear in the movie "Lupin III: Farewell to Nostradamus" as Lupin without problems. At the same time, Yamada recorded a TVCs for Esso Japan featuring Lupin as its image character. At this time, the staff was relieved to find Yamada in good health, but unfortunately, this was the last time he would play Lupin.

In February 1995, Yamada fell ill and went into a coma, leaving Monkey Punch and Yamada co-stars in no doubt that this was the end of Lupin in the anime. However, since the production of the film "Farewell to Nostradamus" had progressed to the point where it could be completed with recordings, the production company decided to release the movie in theaters with Kurita playing the role of Lupin in place of Yamada at short notice. After that recording, Yamada died without regaining consciousness.

After Yamada's death, a memorial message was inserted into the film at the end of the credits: "Mr. Yasuo Yamada, the eternal Lupin III. Thank you". "Lupin III" series was then to continue production, and Kurita officially took over the role of Arsene Lupin III.

== Filmography ==
=== Television animation ===
- Big X (1964)
- Ōgon Bat (1967)
- Kamui the Ninja (1969) (Ikezu)
- Andersen Monogatari (1971) (Zukko)
- Lupin III (1971–72) (Arsène Lupin III)
- Moonlight Mask (1972) (Akira Shinjo)
- Hoshi no Ko Chobin (1974) (Usatan)
- Tekkaman: The Space Knight (1975) (Andro Umeda)
- Huckleberry no Bouken (1976) (Jim)
- Lupin III Part II (1977–80) (Arsène Lupin III)
- Botchan (1980) (Uranari)
- Lupin III Part III (1984–85) (Arsène Lupin III)
- Lupin III: Goodbye Lady Liberty (1989) (Arsène Lupin III)
- Lupin III: Mystery of the Hemingway Papers! (1990) (Arsène Lupin III)
- Lupin III: Steal Napoleon's Dictionary! (1991) (Arsène Lupin III)
- Lupin III: From Russia With Love (1992) (Arsène Lupin III)
- Lupin III: Voyage to Danger (1993) (Arsène Lupin III)
- Lupin III: Dragon of Doom (1994) (Arsène Lupin III)

=== Theatrical animation ===
- Panda! Go, Panda! (1972) (Omawari-san)
- Lupin III: Mystery of Mamo (1978) (Arsène Lupin III)
- Lupin III: The Castle of Cagliostro (1979) (Arsène Lupin III)
- Dr. Slump: "Hoyoyo!" Space Adventure(1982) (Dr. Mashirito)
- Lupin III: Legend of the Gold of Babylon (1985) (Arsène Lupin III)

=== Dubbing ===
==== Live-action ====
- Clint Eastwood
  - Rawhide (Rowdy Yates)
  - A Fistful of Dollars (Joe)
  - Le streghe (Charlie)
  - The Good, the Bad and the Ugly (Blondie)
  - For a Few Dollars More (Manco)
  - Coogan's Bluff (Deputy Sheriff Walt Coogan)
  - Hang 'Em High (Deputy US Marshal Jed Cooper)
  - Where Eagles Dare (Lt. Morris Schaffer)
  - Paint Your Wagon (Pardner)
  - Kelly's Heroes (Private Kelly)
  - Two Mules for Sister Sara (Hogan)
  - The Beguiled (Corporal John 'McBee' McBurney)
  - Dirty Harry (Harry Callahan)
  - Play Misty for Me (Dave Garver)
  - Joe Kidd (Joe Kidd)
  - High Plains Drifter (The Stranger)
  - Magnum Force (Harry Callahan)
  - Thunderbolt and Lightfoot (Thunderbolt)
  - The Eiger Sanction (1978 Fuji TV edition) (Dr. Jonathan Hemlock)
  - The Enforcer (Harry Callahan)
  - The Outlaw Josey Wales (Josey Wales)
  - The Gauntlet (Detective Ben Shockley)
  - Every Which Way but Loose (Philo Beddoe)
  - Escape from Alcatraz (Frank Morris)
  - Any Which Way You Can (Philo Beddoe)
  - Bronco Billy (Bronco Billy)
  - Firefox (Mitchell Gant)
  - Sudden Impact (Harry Callahan)
  - City Heat (Lieutenant Speer)
  - Tightrope (Wes Block)
  - Pale Rider ("Preacher")
  - Heartbreak Ridge (Thomas Highway)
  - The Dead Pool (Harry Callahan)
  - Pink Cadillac (Tommy Nowak)
  - The Rookie (Nick Pulovski)
  - White Hunter Black Heart (John Wilson)
  - Unforgiven (William "Will" Munny)
  - In the Line of Fire (Agent Frank Horrigan)
  - A Perfect World (Chief Red Garnett)
- Jean-Paul Belmondo
  - Two Women (Michele Di Libero)
  - A Man Named Rocca (Roberto La Rocca)
  - Cartouche (Louis-Dominique Bourguignon alias Cartouche)
  - That Man from Rio (Adrien Dufourquet)
  - Is Paris Burning? (Morandat/Pierrelot)
  - Casino Royale (French Legionnaire)
  - Love Is a Funny Thing (Henri)
  - Mississippi Mermaid (Louis Mahé)
  - Borsalino (François Capella)
  - The Married Couple of the Year (Two Nicolas Philibert)
  - Dr. Popaul (Dr. Paul Simay)
  - Le Magnifique (François Merlin / Bob Saint-Clar)
  - Stavisky (Serge Alexandre Stavisky)
- Roddy McDowall
  - Planet of the Apes (Cornelius)
  - Beneath the Planet of the Apes (Cornelius)
  - Escape from the Planet of the Apes (Cornelius)
- Easy Rider (Wyatt (Peter Fonda))
- Monty Python (Graham Chapman)
- Muppets (Kermit the Frog)
- Combat! (PFC Paul "Caje" LeMay (Pierre Jalbert))
- Force 10 from Navarone (1982 Fuji TV edition) (Staff Sergeant John Miller (Edward Fox))
- The French Connection (Salvatore 'Sal' Boca (Tony Lo Bianco))
- Race with the Devil (Roger Marsh (Peter Fonda))
- Return of the Seven (Vin (Robert Fuller))
- Strangers on a Train (Bruno Anthony (Robert Walker))

==== Animated ====
- An American Tail: Fievel Goes West (Cat R. Waul)
- The Fox and the Hound (Dinky the Sparrow)
- Alice in Wonderland (Cheshire Cat) (1973 dub)
- Pinocchio (J. Worthington Foulfellow) (1983 dub)
- One Hundred and One Dalmatians (Horace Badun) (1981 dub)
- Winnie the Pooh and the Honey Tree (Winnie the Pooh)
- The Rescuers (Bernard) (1981 dub)
- The Rescuers Down Under (Bernard)
- Once Upon a Studio (Bernard) (Archived audio)

=== Voice-Over ===
- Pinocchio's Daring Journey (J. Worthington Foulfellow)
- Star Tours (Grand Moff Tarkin)

== Cited references ==
- Ageko, Kaki (1995). ルパン三世よ永遠に: 山田康雄メモリアル [Lupin the Third, Forever: Memorial Book of Yasuo Yamada] (in Japanese). Tokuma Shoten. ISBN 4894526875.
