= Yokohama City University Medical Center =

Coordinates: 35°26′01″N 139°37′30″E

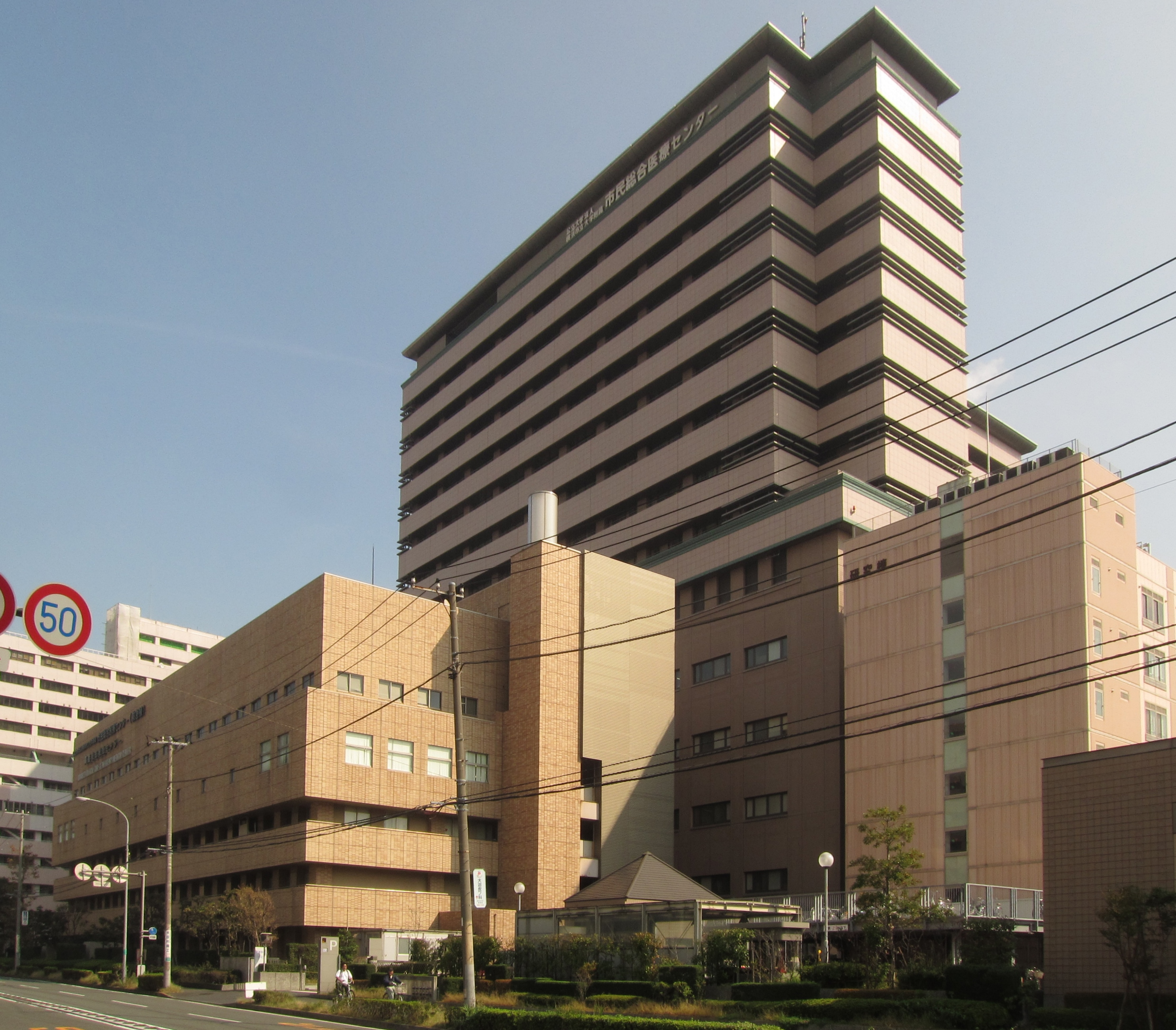

Geography
- Location: 4-57 Urafune, Minami-ku, Yokohama, Kanagawa Prefecture 232-0024, Japan

Organisation
- Care system: Public
- Type: Teaching
- Affiliated university: Yokohama City University

Services
- Emergency department: Tertiary
- Beds: 726

History
- Founded: 1871

Links
- Website: www.yokohama-cu.ac.jp/urahp/
- Lists: Hospitals in Japan

Yokohama City University Medical Center (横浜市立大学附属市民総合医療センター) is a general hospital located in Minami-ku, Yokohama, Japan. Founded in 1871, it is the second oldest western-style hospital in Japan.

== History ==
Its predecessor was founded in 1871, and was renamed "Juzen Hospital" in 1874. In 1892, the Scottish physician and Edinburgh Medical School graduate Neil Gordon Munro became director of the hospital. Yokohama Medical College was established as an attached medical school in 1944. The medical college became Yokohama Medical School in 1947, before being merged with Yokohama City University in 1952. It was later renamed the Yokohama City University Medical Center.

== Facilities and operations ==
Yokohama City University Medical Center is a large general hospital serving the city of Yokohama, and a teaching facility for medical professionals including residents and nurses. It has 10 disease-specific centers, 19 departments, and 726 beds.

=== Disease-specific centers ===
Advanced Critical Care and Emergency Center, General Perinatal Center, Rheumatism and Collagen Disorder Center, Inflammatory Bowel Disease (IBD) Center, Mental health Center, Cardiovascular Center, Gastrointestinal Disease Center, Respiratory Disease Center, Children's Medical Center, Reproduction Center

=== Departments ===
Comprehensive medical care, Hematology, Division of nephrology and hypertension, Endocrine/Diabetes internal medicine, Neurology, Mammary gland/Thyroid gland surgery, Orthopedics, Dermatology, Urology/Renal transplantation, Gynecology, Ophthalmology, Otolaryngology, Radiology, Dentistry/Oral surgery/Orthodontics, Anesthesiology, Neurosurgery, Rehabilitation, Plastic surgery, Diagnostic pathology.

== Rankings ==
Yokohama City University Medical Center was ranked top in the 2012 and 2013 surveys of "The Most Reliable Hospital Ranking in Japan" conducted by the Japanese magazine The Diamond Weekly.
