= Nagoya City University West Medical Center =

Coordinates: 35.2020°N 136.9022°E

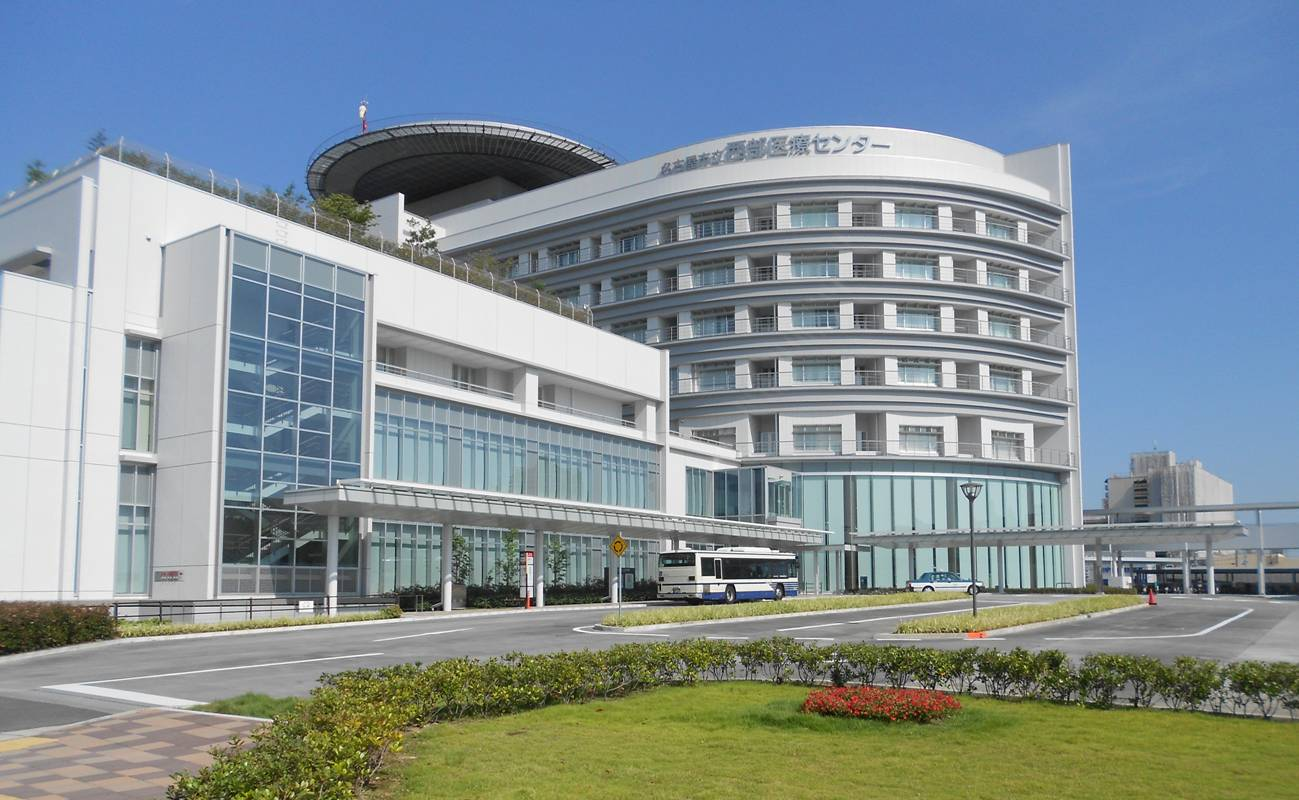

Geography
- Location: 1-1-1 Hirate-cho, Kita-ku, Nagoya, Aichi, Nagoya, Japan

Organisation
- Care system: Public
- Type: Teaching
- Affiliated university: Nagoya City University

Services
- Beds: 500

History
- Opened: 2011

Links
- Website: www.west-medical-center.city.nagoya.jp
- Lists: Hospitals in Japan

Nagoya City University West Medical Center (名古屋市立大学附属西部医療センター, Nagoya shiritsu daigaku fuzoku Seibu Iryō Sentā) is a general hospital located in Kita-ku, Nagoya, Japan, which is administered by the City of Nagoya. This hospital was established in May 2011, from the merger of two hospitals, Nagoya City Jouhoku Hospital and Nagoya City Jousai Hospital.

== Overview ==
Nagoya City University West Medical Center has 500 beds. Its building has 8 floors with a total floor area of 42,590.53 m^{2}.

This hospital is putting a lot of resources into perinatal care, which is certified as Baby Friendly Hospital (BFH) by WHO and UNICEF. There are 36 beds in neonatal intensive care unit (NICU), which accepts neonates requiring intensive care from the north region of Nagoya city and its suburbs such as Kasugai city or Komaki city.

In February 2013, Nagoya Proton Therapy Center, which is the first proton therapy facility in the three Tokai prefectures of Aichi, Gifu, and Mie, was opened.

== History ==
- Nagoya City Jouhoku Hospital was established in 1941.
- Nagoya City West Medical Center was established in May 2011.
- In February 2013, Nagoya Proton Therapy Center was opened.

== Services ==
Nagoya City West Medical Center offers the following services:

- Respiratory Medicine
- Gastroenterology
- Cardiology
- Nephrology and Dialysis
- Neurology
- Hematology and Oncology
- Endocrinology
- Respiratory Surgery
- Gastrointestinal Surgery
- Breast and Endocrine Surgery
- Pediatric Surgery
- Neurosurgery
- Orthopedic Surgery
- Plastic Surgery
- Psychiatry
- Child Psychiatry
- Rheumatology
- Pediatrics
- Pediatric Allergy
- Dermatology
- Urology
- Obstetrics and Gynecology
- Ophthalmology
- Otolaryngology – Ear, Nose and Throat
- Physical Medicine and Rehabilitation
- Diagnostic radiography
- Radiation Therapy
- Pathology
- Anesthesiology
- Oral and Maxillofacial Surgery

== Access ==
This center is just 10 and 15 minutes by taxi from Sakae station and Nagoya station, respectively. There are direct bus routes from Sakae station, from Nagoya station and from nearest station, Kurokawa. This hospital was reached for about 5 minutes from the Kurokawa, Shonai-dori, or Torimi-cho exits on the Nagoya Expressway. Parking garage is next to the hospital, connected with the hospital via a passageway.
