= Osaka General Medical Center =

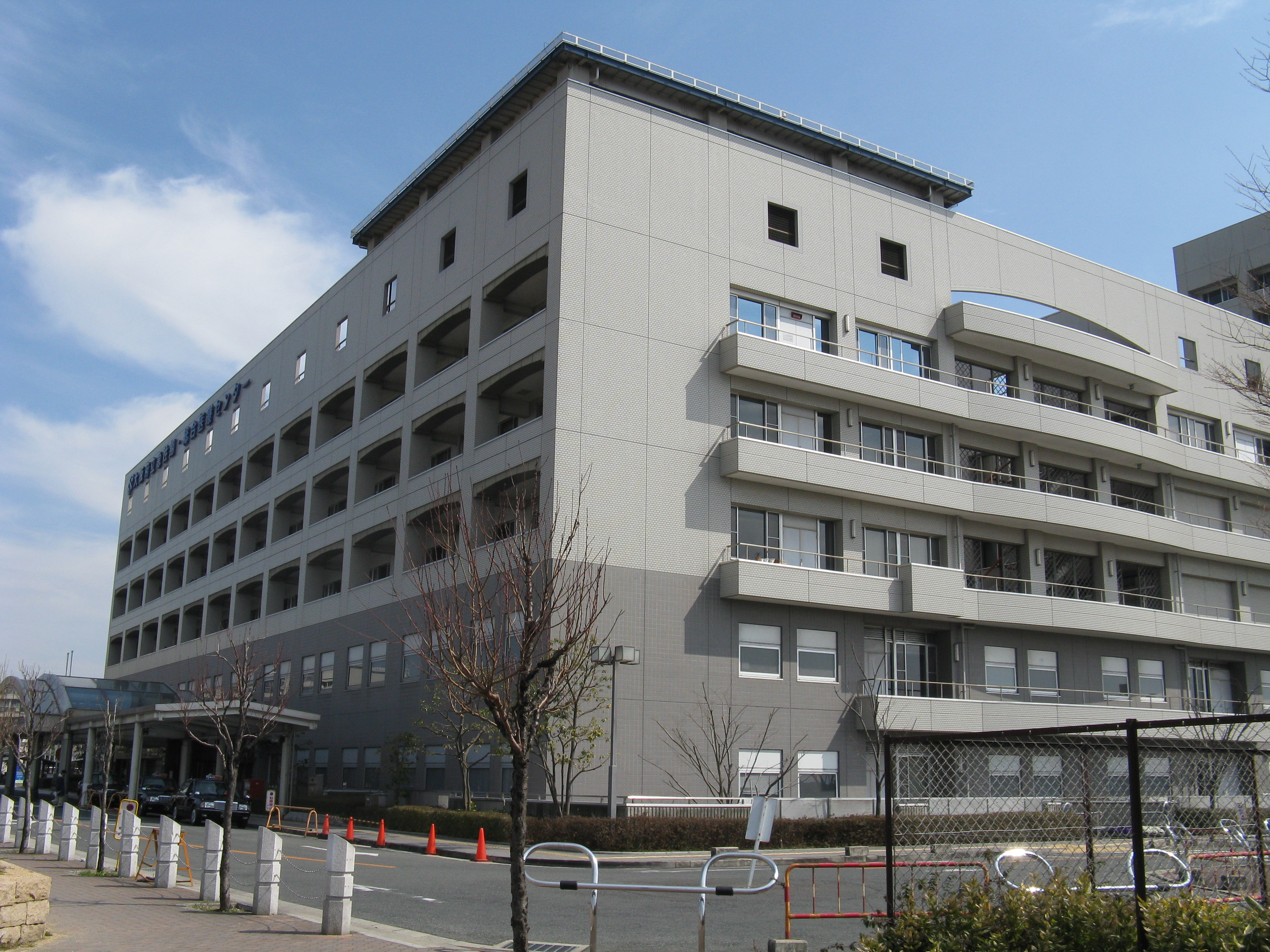
- Hospital exterior

Geography
- Location: Sumiyoshi-ku, Osaka, Japan
- Coordinates: 34°37′0.94″N 135°30′19.03″E

Organisation
- Type: Public

Services
- Emergency department: Yes
- Beds: 865

Helipads
- Helipad: Yes

Osaka General Medical Center (Osaka General Medical Center) is located in Sumiyoshi-ku, Osaka, Japan. It has 865 beds and is run by the Osaka Prefectural government. The hospital was founded in 1871, and its role includes comprehensive rehabilitation medical care from the acute stage to the convalescent stage.

== History ==
The hospital was established in March 1871 as Bodokuin. Later, in January 1955, the name was changed to Osaka Prefectural Hospital, and with the addition and renovation of the wards, it became a general hospital with 11 departments and 330 beds.

== Departments ==
- Internal Medicine
  - General internal medicine
  - Respiratory medicine
  - Gastroenterology
  - Cardiology
  - Diabetic endocrinology
  - Nephrology/Hypertension Internal Medicine
  - Neurology
  - Immunorheumatology
  - Hematology/Oncology
  - Pediatrics
  - Psychiatry
  - Dermatology
- Surgery
  - Digestive surgery
  - Breast surgery
  - Pediatric surgery
  - Respiratory surgery
  - Cardiovascular surgery
  - Neurosurgery
  - Orthopedic surgery
  - Obstetrics and gynecology
  - Urology
  - Ophthalmology
  - Otolaryngology/head and neck surgery
  - Plastic surgery
  - Dental and oral surgery
  - Anesthesiology

== Transport ==
The hospital is 15-minute walk from Tezukayama Station on the Nankai Electric RailwayKōya Line.

== See also ==
- List of hospitals in Japan
