= National Hospital Organization Nagara Medical Center =

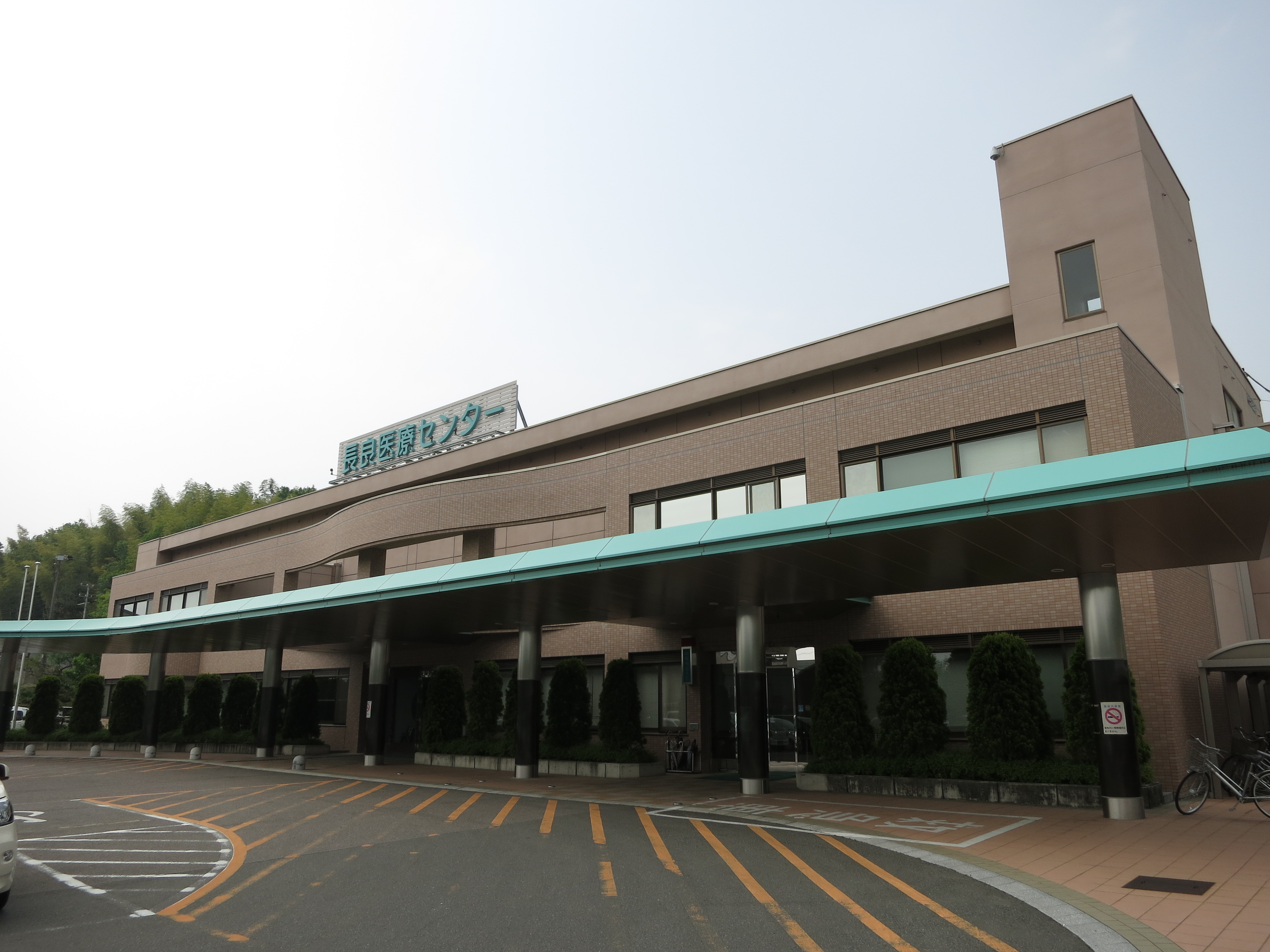

Geography
- Location: 1300-7, Nagara, Gifu, Gifu, 502-8558, Japan
- Coordinates: 35.4518°N 136.7882°E

Organisation
- Care system: Public
- Type: Specialist
- Affiliated university: Graduate School of Medicine and Faculty of Medicine, Kyoto University, Gifu University

Services
- Beds: 468
- Speciality: Respiratory Obstetrics Pediatrics

History
- Opened: 2005

Links
- Website: www.hosp.go.jp/~ngr/
- Lists: Hospitals in Japan

National Hospital Organization Nagara Medical Center (国立病院機構長良医療センター) is a hospital located in Gifu, Japan, which is administered by the National Hospital Organization of Japan. This hospital was established in March 2005, from the merger of two hospitals, National Hospital Organization Gifu Hospital and National Hospital Organization Nagara Hospital. There are 500-800 employees working at the hospital.

== Overview ==
National Hospital Organization Nagara Medical Center has 468 beds. 120 of them are for the severely multiple handicapped children, 80 for the patients of muscular dystrophy, and 52 for the patients of tuberculosis. Nagara Medical Center has three major missions: Child health and development medicine (obstetrics, prenatal care, pediatrics), disability medicine (severe cases of multiple handicap, and muscular dystrophy), and cardiovascular and respiratory medicine (ICU).

== History ==
National Hospital Organization Nagara Hospital was established in 1927. The National Hospital Organization Gifu Hospital was established in 1939.

== Services ==
- Cardiology
- Neurology
- Obstetrics—prenatal care
- Pediatrics—GCU (Growing Care Unit), NICU, pediatric neurology,

pediatric surgery

- Physiatry—Physical therapy, Neuropsychological and Psychiatric rehabilitation
- Plastic surgery
- Pulmonology—respiratory care
- Radiology

=== Other services and departments ===
- Clinical laboratory
- Clinical research
- Clinical Pharmacology
- Educational support
- Medical support complying to the "Act for General Support for Persons with Disabilities"
- Nutrition support
- Pharmacy
