= Kizawa Memorial Hospital =

Coordinates: 35.4408°N 137.0234°E

- 社会医療法人厚生会 木沢記念病院
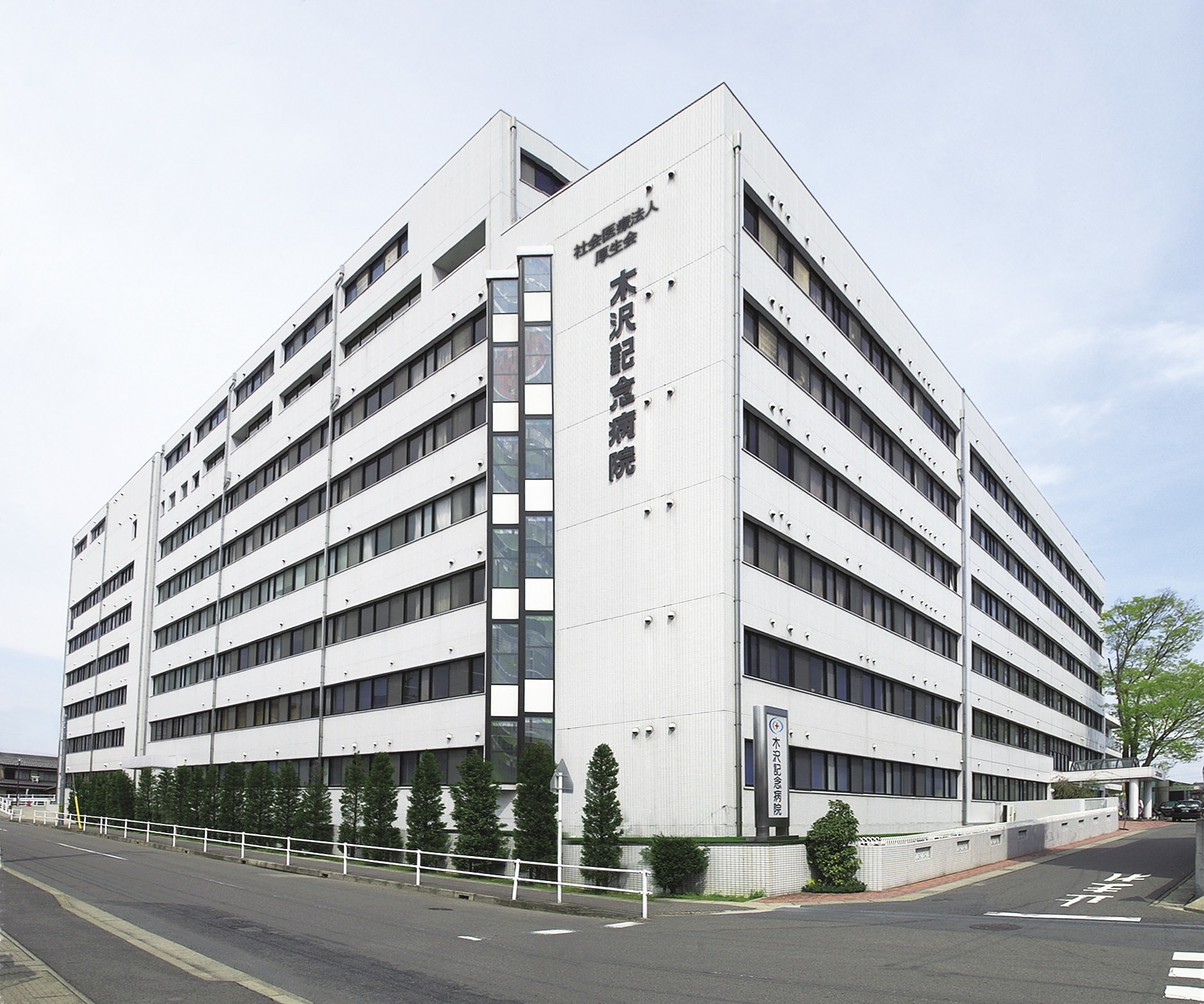

Geography
- Location: Shimo Kobi 590, Kobi-cho; Minokamo, Gifu Prefecture, 505-8503, Japan

Organisation
- Care system: Semi-public, non-for-profit

Services
- Emergency department: Level II (Chuno district)
- Beds: 452

History
- Founded: 1913

Links
- Website: kizawa-memorial-hospital.jp
- Lists: Hospitals in Japan

Kizawa Memorial Hospital (木沢記念病院, kizawa kinen byouin) is a semi-public non-for-profit general hospital located in central Japan. It is the flagship hospital of the Koseikai Health System (社会医療法人厚生会shakai iryo hojin koseikai). It serves the cities of Minokamo, Kani and surrounding municipalities with a combined population of more than 200,000 persons. It is one of the eight major centers for urgent care and disaster response designated by the Gifu Prefectural Government.

The hospital was founded in 1913 as The Recovery Clinic (回生院 Kaisei-In). By 1952, the clinic had become a small hospital (23 beds) and was renamed Kizawa Hospital after the founder. In 1966, the hospital had grown to 190 beds. The current hospital has 452 beds. In 2012, the hospital was ranked #17 nationwide in the private non-profit category.

== Activity ==
Statistics for Jan-Dec. 2013.

- Admissions
  - First admissions: 9,033
- Surgeries: 2,837
- Outpatient visits: 251,279
- ER presentations
  - Walk-in: 16,465
  - Ambulance: 3,512
  - ER admissions: 2,721
- Births: 345
- CT: 26,048
- MRI: 10,571
- PET: 2,491
- Tomotherapy: 10,038

== Medical Technology ==
- daVinci Robotic Surgical Assistance System (2010)
- 3.0T MRI (2009)
- 320-row Dynamic CT Aquilion ONE (2008)
- TomoTherapy Hi-Art (2005, 2008)
- PET-CT (2006)

== Staff ==
- Physicians: 107
- Nurses, nurse aids and midwives: 500
- Pharmacists: 19
- Radiological and physiological technicians: 56
- Rehabilitation therapists: 67
- Administrative/other: 194

== Notable Persons ==
=== Jitsuhiro Yamada ===
CEO of Koseikai Health System since 2000. Neurosurgeon. International President of Lions Clubs International.

=== Yasuo Kitajima ===
Director of Kizawa Memorial Hospital since 2009. Dermatologist. Best Doctors in Japan Award, 2010, 2011, 2012, 2013, 2014. Former director of Gifu University Hospital. Recurring guest on Takeshi Kitano's health-themed variety show.

=== Shigetoyo Saji ===
Special advisor of Kizawa Memorial Hospital. Oncology surgeon. Current president of the Asian Clinical Oncology Society. Former director of Gifu University Hospital.

== Accreditations ==
- JCAHC Accredited Hospital (#128)
- MINDS Medical Information Network Distribution Service (Japan Ministry of Health and Labor)
- VHJ, Voluntary Hospitals of Japan
- Japan Council for Evaluation of Postgraduate Clinical Training
- Gifu Prefectural DMAT Disaster Response Team Designated Hospital
- Gifu Prefectural Designated Higher Brain Dysfunction Support Hospital

== Affiliated Institutions ==
- Central Japan Medical Center for Prolonged Traumatic Brain Dysfunction (中部療護センター chubu ryogo senta)
  Operated by Kizawa Memorial Hospital, administered by National Agency for Automotive Safety and Victim’s Aid (NASVA) (独立行政法人自動車事故対策機構), a subsidiary of the MLIT. It has a 50-bed ward for patients with prolonged brain dysfunction due to traffic-related injury.
- Dialysis Center
  112 patients (41 beds)
- Tajimi City Hospital
- Nozomi no Oka Mental Hospital
- Ajisai Nursing College
- Club M
  Medical fitness club.

== Public Transport ==
- JR Mino-Ōta Station, 1 km
- Meitetsu Nihon Rhine Imawatari Station, 5.5 km
