= Fujisawa City Hospital =

Coordinates: 35°21′02″N 139°28′54″E

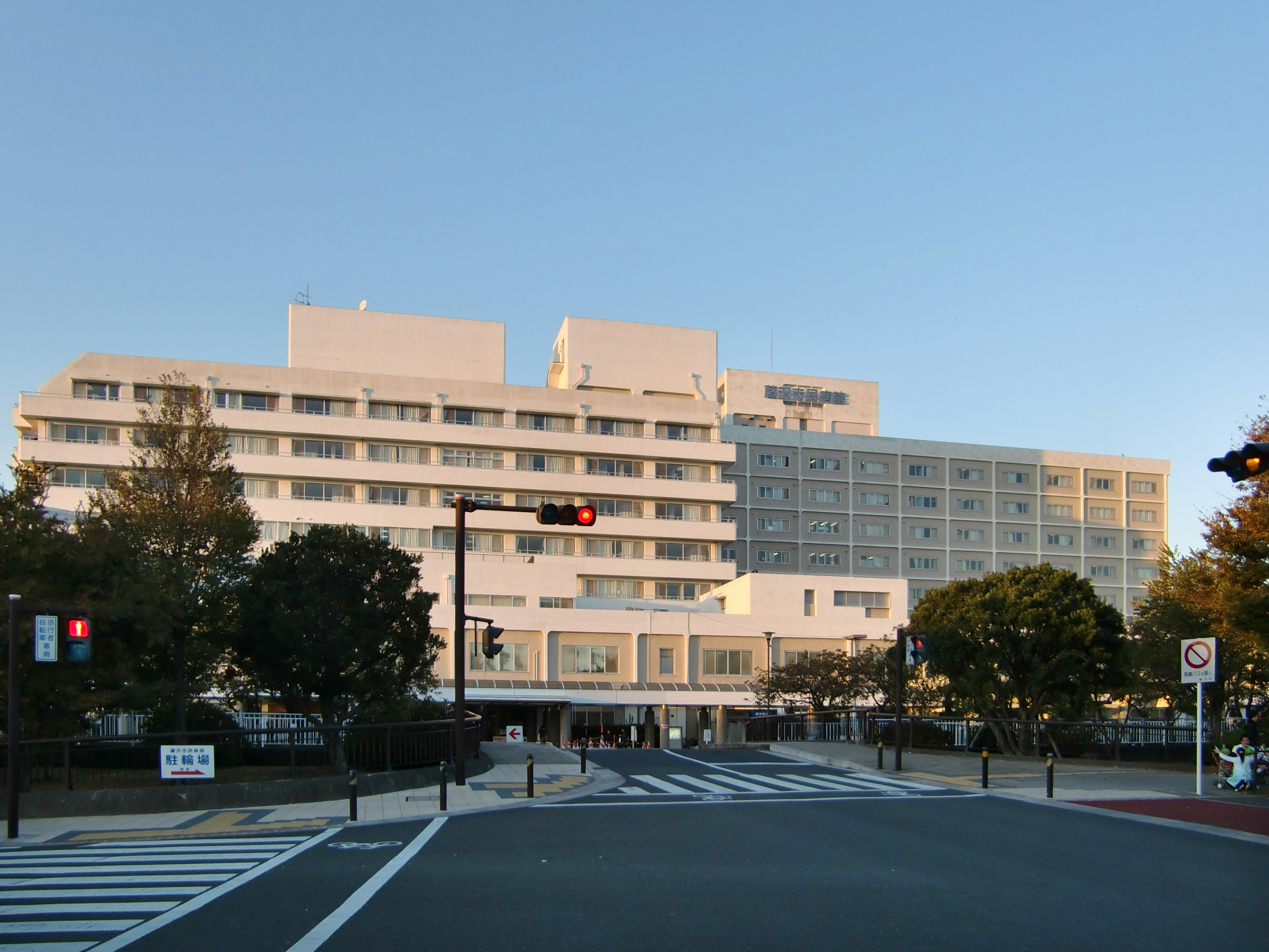
- Fujisawa City Hospital, November 2010

Geography
- Location: 2-6-1 Fujisawa, Fujisawa, Kanagawa 104-8560, Japan

Organisation
- Care system: Public
- Type: District

Services
- Emergency department: Tertiary
- Beds: 536

History
- Opened: 1971

Links
- Website: www.city.fujisawa.kanagawa.jp/hospital/index.html
- Lists: Hospitals in Japan

Fujisawa City Hospital (藤沢市民病院, Fujisawa Shimin Byōin) is a general hospital in Fujisawa, Kanagawa, Japan. Founded in 1971, the hospital is also a district hospital serving the neighbouring cities of Chigasaki and Kamakura.

== Facilities and operations ==
Fujisawa City Hospital has 536 beds, and treated 173,077 inpatients and 357,994 outpatients in fiscal 2011. The hospital is also a teaching facility for medical professionals including resident physicians and nurses.

Departments include Cardiology, Respiratory medicine, Gastrointestinal medicine, Nephrology, Nurology, Endocrine/Diabetes internal medicine, Hematology and Rheumatology, Psychiatrics, Dermatology, Orthopedics, Ophthalmology, Otolaryngology, Surgery, Neurosurgery, Plastic surgery, Rehabilitation, Diagnostic pathology, Radiology, Dentistry, Anesthesiology, Pediatrics, Comprehensive medical care, children's medical examination center and Emergency Center.
