= Neil Gordon Munro =

Scottish physician and anthropologist

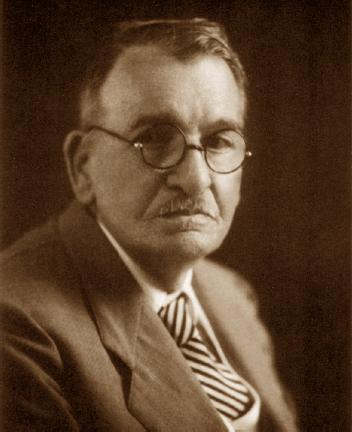
- Neil Gordon Munro
- Born: 16 June 1863; Scotland
- Died: 11 April 1942 (aged 78)
- Resting place: Japan
- Occupations: physician and anthropologist

Neil Gordon Munro (1863–1942) was a Scottish physician and anthropologist. Resident in Japan for almost fifty years, he was notable as an early archaeologist and one of the first Westerners to study the Ainu people of Hokkaido.

== Biography ==
Educated in the University of Edinburgh Medical School M.B., C.M. 1888 and M.D. 1909, he traveled in India before settling in Yokohama as director of Yokohama Juzen Hospital which was one of the largest western-style hospitals in Asia in 1893. From 1930 until his death he lived among the Ainu in Nibutani village in Hokkaido. Film footage he took of the local people survives.

Between 1908 and 1914 he sent more than 2,000 objects (including archaeological ceramics, metalwork, shells, bones and stone tools; musical instruments, Buddhist objects and Ainu material) to the Royal Scottish Museum (today's National Museum of Scotland) in Edinburgh. He authored several volumes, among them Coins of Japan (1904), Prehistoric Japan (1908), and Ainu Creed and Cult (with H Watanabe & B Z Seligman, 1962).

== Books ==
- Coins of Japan (1904) ISBN 4-87187-868-6
- Prehistoric Japan (1908)
