= Yokohama Rosai Hospital =

- Japan Organization of Occupational Health and Safety
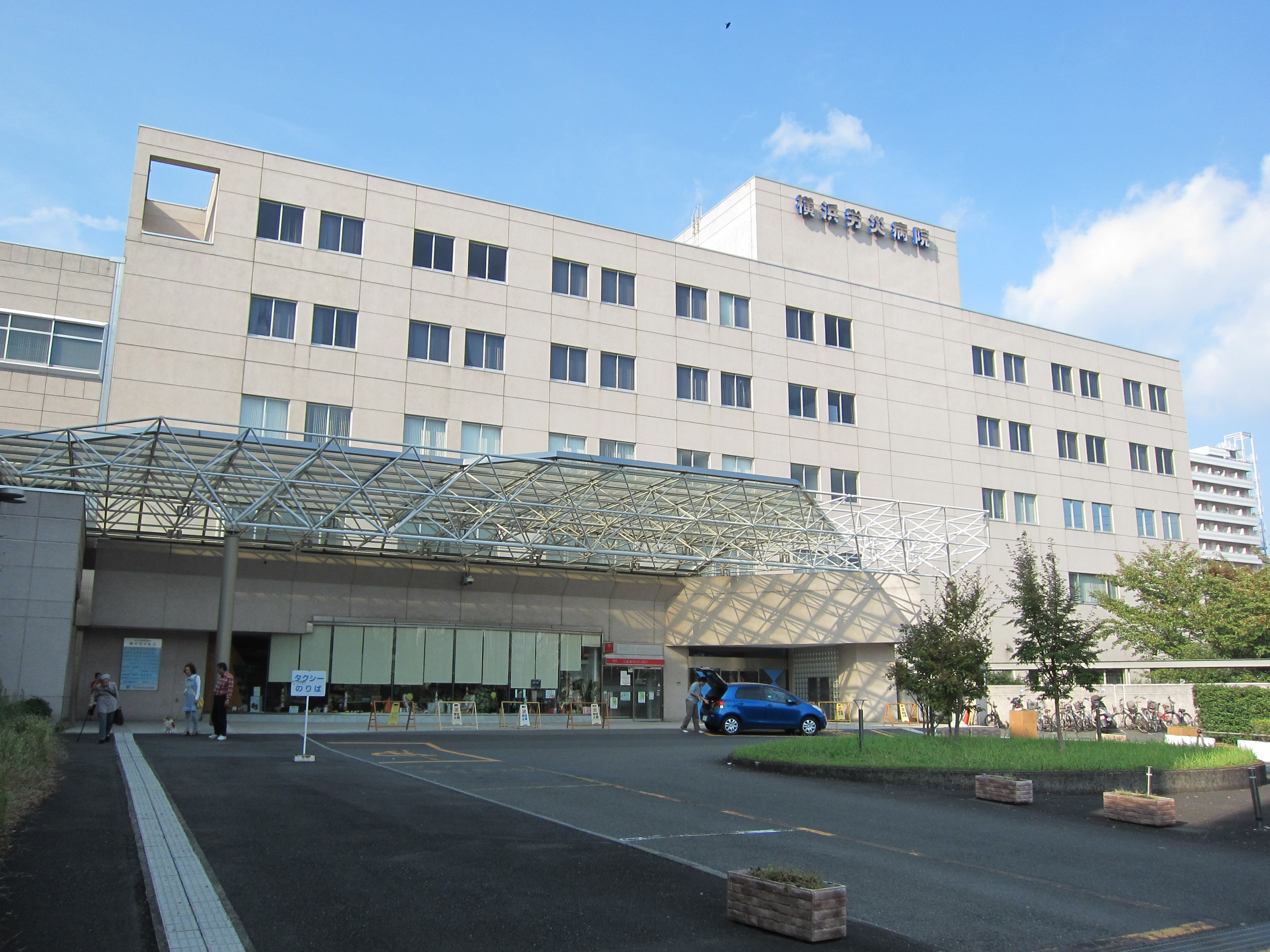
- Yokohama Rosai Hospital, October 2011

- Location of hospital on map of Yokohama

Geography
- Location: 3211 Kozukue-chō, Kōhoku-ku, Yokohama, Kanagawa Prefecture 222-0036, Japan
- Coordinates: 35°30′40″N 139°36′41.5″E

Organisation
- Care system: Public
- Type: Teaching
- Affiliated university: Yokohama City University; University of Tokyo; Chiba University

Services
- Emergency department: Yes
- Beds: 650

History
- Opened: June 1991

Links
- Website: yokohamah.johas.go.jp/index.html
- Lists: Hospitals in Japan

Yokohama Rosai Hospital (横浜労災病院, Yokohama Rōsai Byōin) (Note: Officially Independent Administrative Institution Japan Organization of Occupational Health and Safety Yokohama Rosai Hospital (独立行政法人 労働者健康安全機構 横浜労災病院, Dokuritsu Gyōsei Hōjin Rōdōsha Kenkō Anzen Kikō Yokohama Rōsai Byōin)) is a hospital in the Kōhoku ward of Yokohama, Kanagawa, Japan. It is adjacent to Nissan Stadium and is accessible on foot from Shin-Yokohama Station.

As one of the hospitals owned and operated by the Japan Organization of Occupational Health and Safety (JOHAS), an independent administrative institution, it is classified as a workplace accident and illness hospital (rōsai byōin). The hospital also functions as a general hospital for members of the public and includes a 24-hour emergency and critical care center.

Opened in June 1991, the hospital serves as a teaching hospital affiliated with Yokohama City University, University of Tokyo, and Chiba University. It is designated by the City of Yokohama as one of the city's disaster base hospitals during times of natural disaster.

== Facilities and operations ==
Yokohama Rosai Hospital has 650 beds, with space for up to 880 beds in the future. The facility comprises three principal buildings: the inpatients' ward, the central clinic, and the outpatients' ward. These three buildings are joined by a series of corridors forming a central indoor plaza.

Departments include Hematology, Nephrology, Oncology, Rheumatology, Psychiatry, Psychosomatic Medicine, Neurology, Respiratory Medicine, Gastroenterology, Cardiovascular Medicine, Pediatrics, Neonatology, Orthopedic Surgery, Plastic Surgery, Neurosurgery, Respiratory Surgery, Cardiovascular Surgery, Dermatology, Urology, Obstetrics and Gynecology, Ophthalmology, Otolaryngology, Rehabilitation Medicine, Radiotherapy, Radiology, Anesthesiology, Clinical Laboratory, Pathology, Dentistry, Dentistry and Oral Surgery, and Emergency.

Some English speaking services are available.
