= Tokyo Metropolitan Bokutoh Hospital =

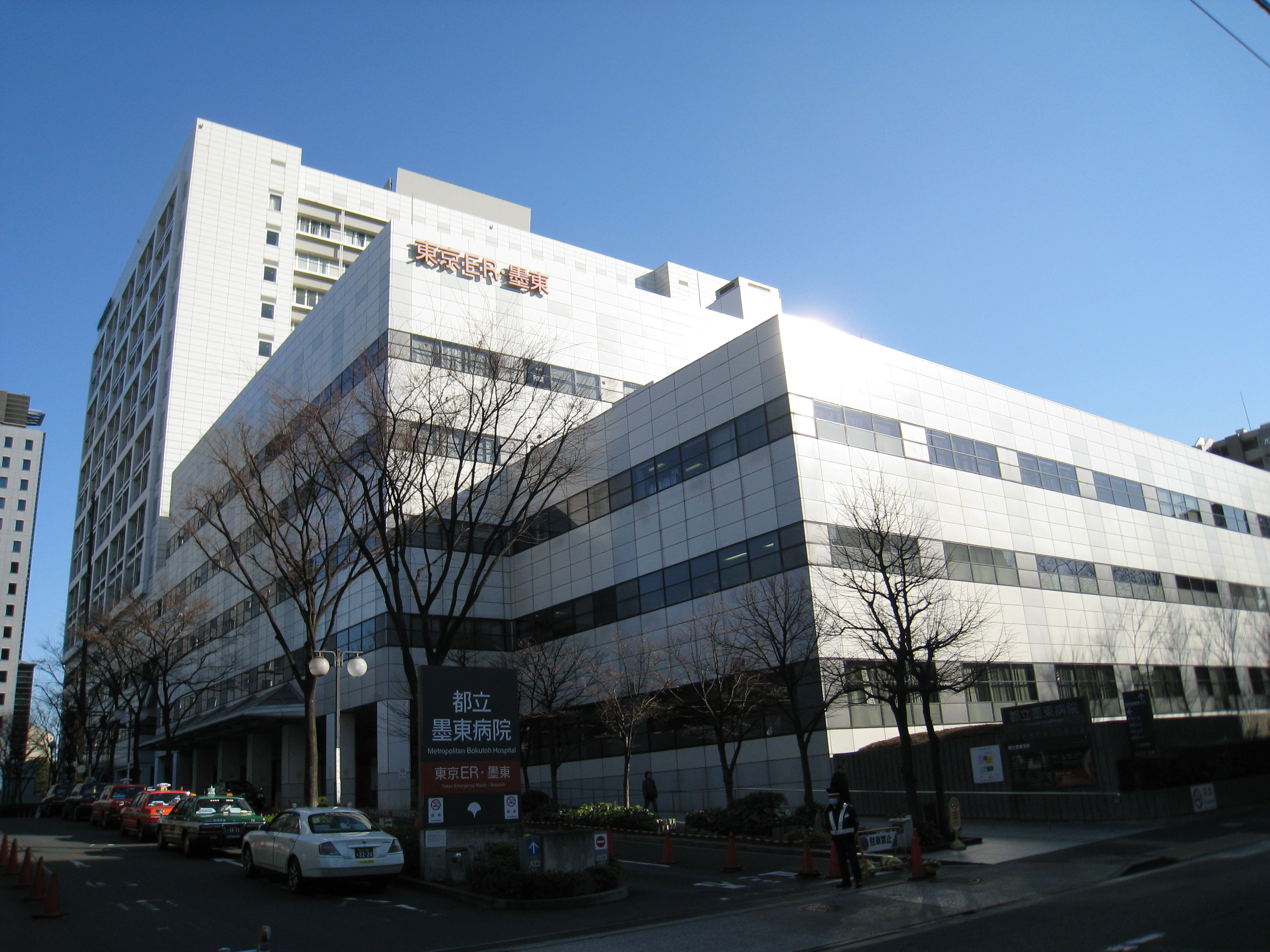
- Hospital exterior

Geography
- Location: Sumida, Tokyo, Japan
- Coordinates: 35.6946°N 139.8187°E

Organisation
- Type: Public

Services
- Emergency department: Yes
- Beds: 765

Helipads
- Helipad: Yes

Tokyo Metropolitan Bokutoh Hospital (東京都立墨東病院) is located in Kotobashi, Sumida, Tokyo, Japan. It has 765 beds and is run by the Tokyo Metropolitan Government.

== History ==
The hospital was established on 1 April 1961 through the merger of two hospitals in Sumida ward.

== Campus ==
The hospital campus comprises three interconnected medical blocks. A helicopter pad is located on the roof of the tallest block.

The newest block was completed in 2014. It was designed by K.ITO Architects & Engineers.

== Departments ==
- Accident and emergency
- Anesthesiology
- Blood transfusion
- Cardiology
- Cardiovascular surgery
- Clinical laboratory
- Dentistry and oral surgery
- Dermatology
- Endoscopy
- General medicine
- Infectious diseases
- Internal medicine
- Neonatology
- Neurosurgery
- Obstetrics and gynecology
- Ophthalmology
- Orthopedic surgery
- Otorhinolaryngology
- Plastic and reconstructive surgery
- Psychiatry
- Pediatrics
- Radiology
- Rehabilitation
- Rheumatology
- Surgery
- Tertiary emergency medical centre
- Thoracic surgery
- Urology

== Transport ==
The hospital is within walking distance of Kinshichō Station.

== See also ==
- List of hospitals in Japan
