= Kanagawa Cancer Center =

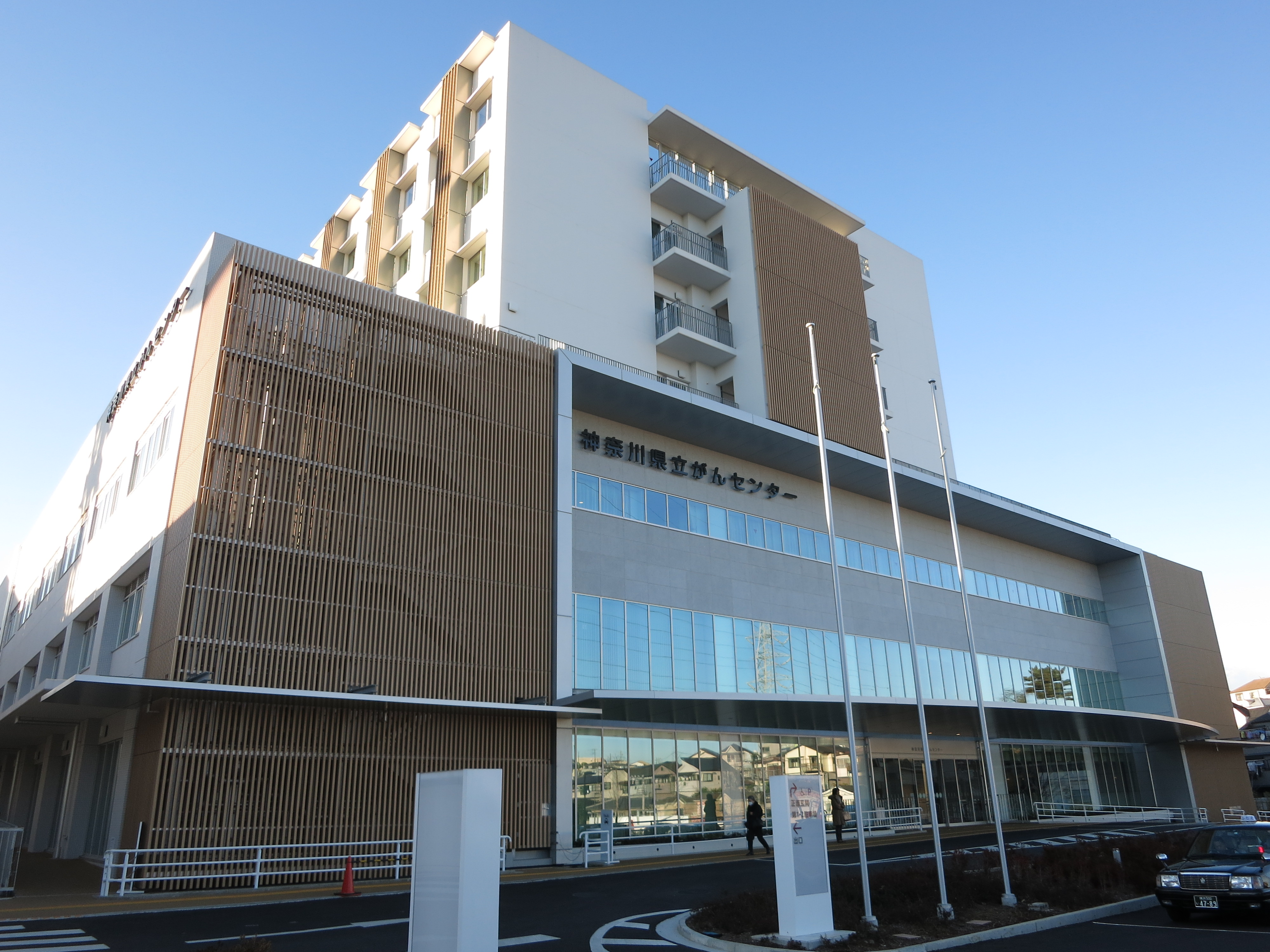
- Kanagawa Cancer Center in 2013

Geography
- Location: 2-3-2 Nakao, Asahi-ku, Yokohama, Kanagawa 241-8515, Japan
- Coordinates: 35°28′01″N 139°31′25″E

Organisation
- Care system: Public
- Type: Specialist
- Affiliated university: Kanagawa University of Human Services

Services
- Beds: 415
- Speciality: Cancer

History
- Opened: 1986

Links
- Website: http://kcch.kanagawa-pho.jp/
- Lists: Hospitals in Japan

The Kanagawa Cancer Center (神奈川県立がんセンター) is a comprehensive cancer center in Yokohama, Japan. The Cancer Center which consists of research institute and hospital is now an ancillary establishment of Kanagawa Prefectural Hospital Organization. In 2015, I-ROCK (Ion-beam Radiation Oncology Center in Kanagawa) in the Cancer Center will be open as a new Heavy-ion treatment center.

== History ==
The Kanagawa Cancer Center was established in 1986 as a professional diagnostic equipment to research of geriatric diseases which was higher in rank of death rate in Japan. When the Cancer Center started they have just 31 beds for patients, however the number of patients increased and the beds jumped to 415 recently. The Cancer Center has folded a full membership of the Union for International Cancer Control since 1987.

In November 2013, the Cancer Center relocated in the present place with the most up-to-date facilities.

== Education ==
The Kanagawa Cancer Center Hospital is today a large cancer hospital as well as a recognised teaching facility for medical professionals including physicians and nurses specializing in clinical oncology. In addition, Yokohama City University Graduate School of Medicine is engaged in "Joint Graduate School Programs" with the Research Institute, Kanagawa Cancer Center.

== Organization ==
=== Hospital ===
==== Departments ====
- Gastroenterological Medical Oncology and Surgery
- Thoracic Medical Oncology and Surgery
- Breast Medical Oncology and Surgery
- Gynecology (Gynecological Oncology)
- Urology (Genitourinary Oncology)
- Orthopedic Oncology
- Head and Neck Oncology
- Neurosurgery
- Plastic and Reconstructive Surgery
- Dermatology
- Diagnostic Radiology
- Pathology

==== I-ROCK (Ion-beam Radiation Oncology Center in Kanagawa) ====
- Radiation Oncology

=== Research Institute ===
==== Departments ====
- Molecular Pathobiology of Cancer
- Biology of Cancer
- Therapeutics of Cancer
- Prophylaxis and Information Science of Cancer

==== Projects ====
- Molecular Diagnostics Project
- Hypoxia Biology Research Project
- Epigenetics Research Project
- Drug Molecular Design Research Project
- Anticancer Drug Research Project
- Molecular Diagnostic Project
- Cancer Prevention Project
