= Kanagawa Children's Medical Center =

Hospital in Yokohama, Japan

Coordinates: 35°25′16″N 139°34′45″E

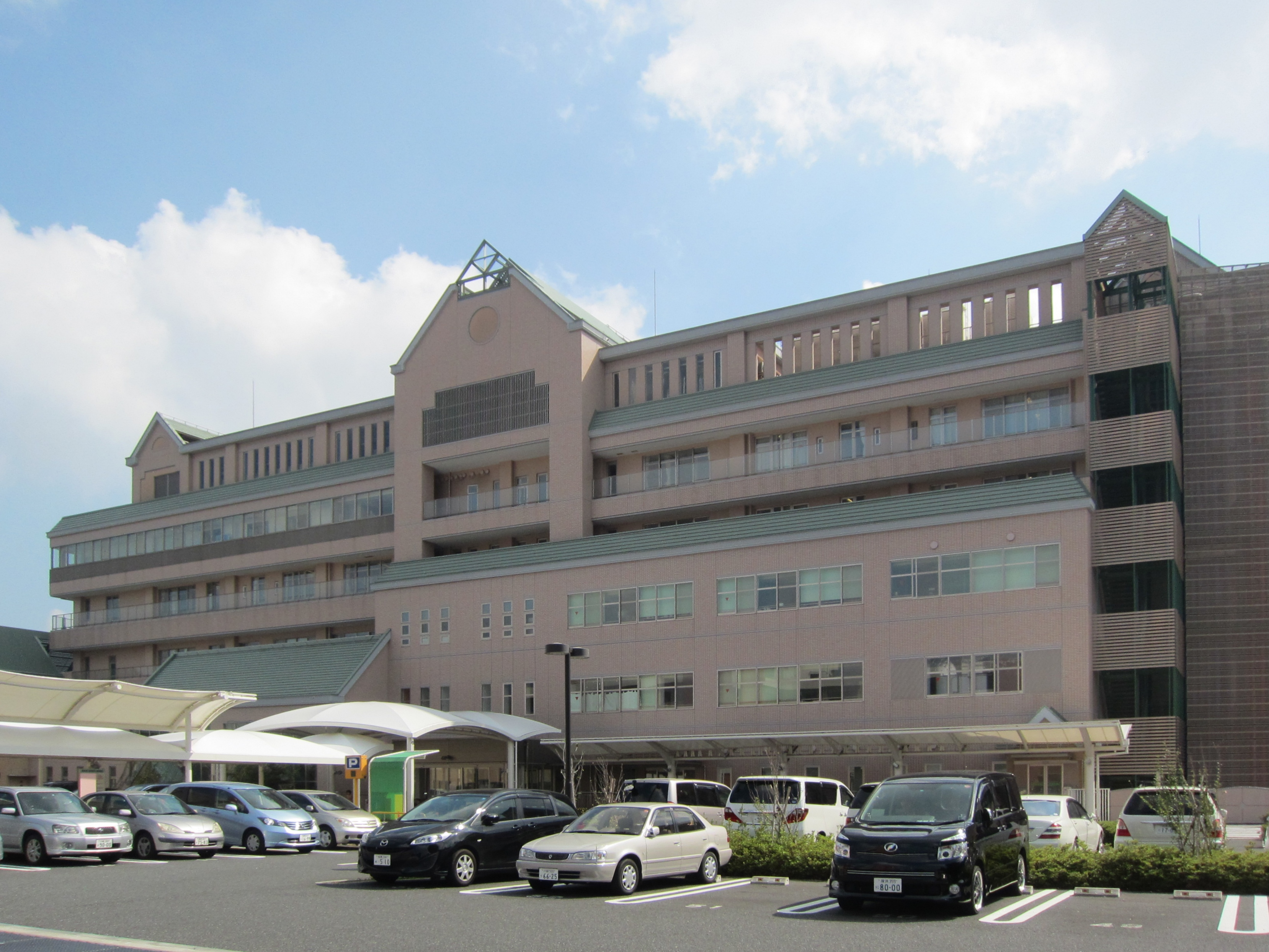

Geography
- Location: 2-138-4 Mutsugawa, Minami-ku, Yokohama, Kanagawa 232-8555, Japan

Organisation
- Care system: Public
- Type: Specialist
- Affiliated university: Yokohama City University, Keio University

Services
- Beds: 419
- Speciality: Pediatrics

History
- Opened: 1970

Links
- Website: kcmc.kanagawa-pho.jp
- Lists: Hospitals in Japan

The Kanagawa Children's Medical Center (神奈川県立こども医療センター) is a children's hospital in Yokohama, Japan. The center is a core facility of pediatric care for Kanagawa Prefecture. It consists of a research institute and hospital, and is now an ancillary establishment of Kanagawa Prefectural Hospital Organization.

== History ==
The Kanagawa Children's Medical Center was established in 1970 as the first children's hospital in Kanagawa Prefecture.

== Organization ==
- Hospital
- Clinical Research Institute
