= Osaka Dental University Hospital =

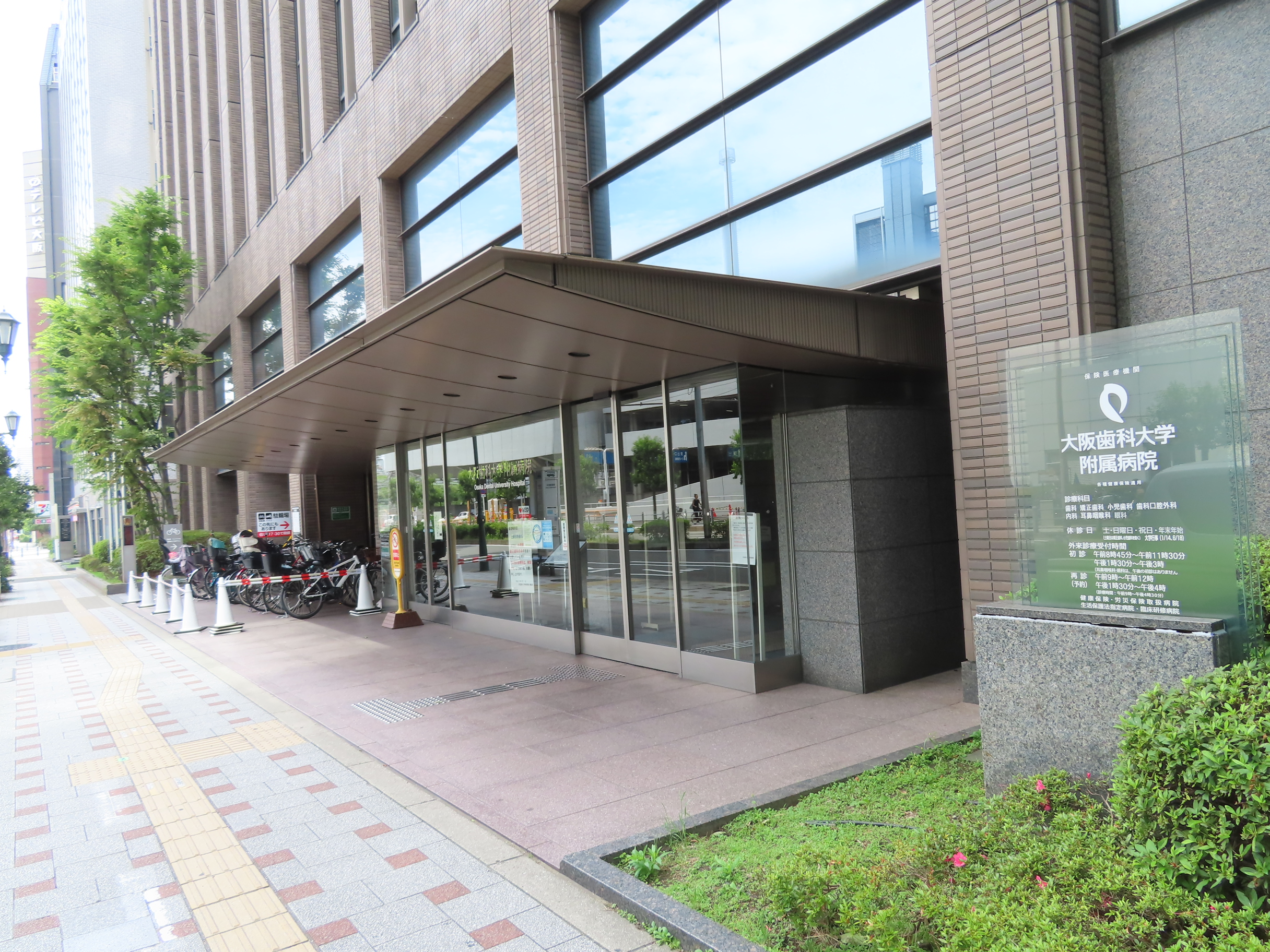

Geography
- Location: Chūō-ku, Osaka, Japan
- Coordinates: 34°41′24″N 135°31′10″E

Organisation
- Funding: Private
- Type: Teaching
- Affiliated university: Osaka Dental University

Services
- Beds: 35

History
- Opened: 1913

Links
- Website: www.osaka-dent.ac.jp/hospital/

Osaka Dental University Hospital (大阪歯科大学附属病院, Osaka shika daigaku fuzoku byōin) is a university hospital located in Chūō-ku, Osaka, Japan, affiliated with Osaka Dental University.

== Medical departments ==
This hospital has following departments:

=== Dental ===
- Operative dentistry
- Endodontics
- Periodontics
- Geriatric dentistry
- Fixed and removable prosthodontics and occlusion
- Oral and maxillofacial surgery
- Diagnostic imaging
- Orthodontics
- Pediatric dentistry
- Dentistry for disability and oral health
- Oral omplantology
- Anesthesiology
- Oral diagnosis and interdisciplinary dentistry
- Oral rehabilitation
- Interdisciplinary dentistry

=== Medical ===
- Internal medicine
- Otorhinolaryngology
- Ophthalmology

=== Special clinics ===
- Dry mouth
- Dry eye
- Halitosis
- Aesthetic dentistry
- Temporomandibular joint disease
- Oral tumors
- Jaw deformity
- Cleft lip and palate
- Dental sleep dedicine
- Sleep apnea
- Dental CAD/CAM center

== Access ==
- Keihan Electric Railway "Temmabashi Station"
- Osaka Metro Tanimachi Line "Temmabashi Station"
