= Ebara Hospital =

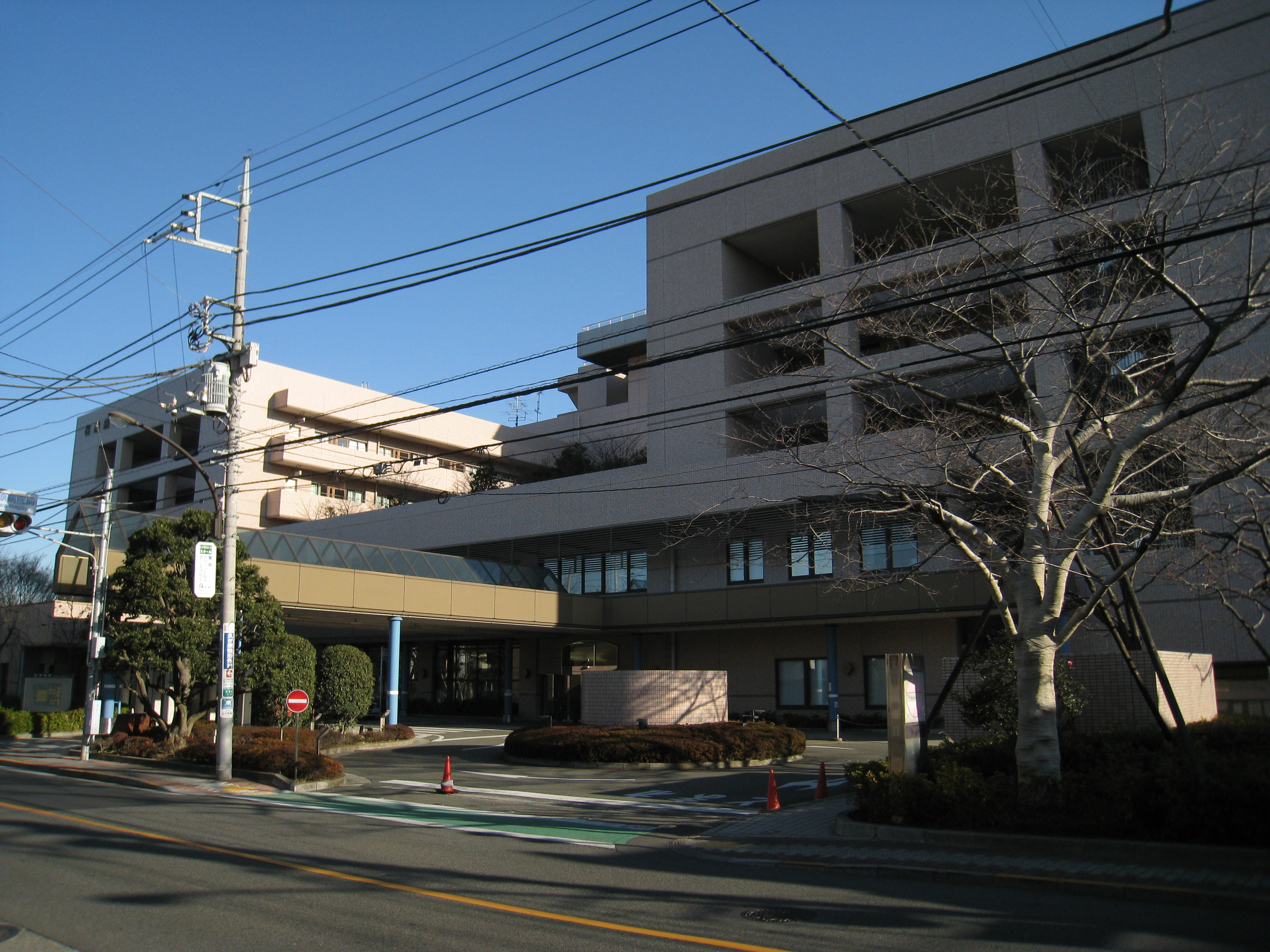
- Hospital entrance

Geography
- Location: Ōta, Tokyo, Japan
- Coordinates: 35.5941°N 139.6934°E

Services
- Beds: 506

Helipads
- Helipad: Yes

History
- Opened: 1898

Links
- Website: www.ebara-hp.ota.tokyo.jp

Ebara Hospital (荏原病院) is in Ōta, Tokyo, Japan. It has 506 beds and is run by the Tokyo Metropolitan Health and Hospitals Corporation.

The hospital is located near Haneda Airport, so it often provides treatment to those returning from abroad. It is specially equipped to manage infectious diseases.

== History ==
The hospital was established in July 1898.

During the 2020 coronavirus pandemic, Ebara Hospital took in the first Japanese evacuees from Wuhan, China, who showed symptoms of the disease. The hospital has rooms with negative air pressure ventilation systems designed to prevent the spread of infectious diseases.

== Departments ==
- Anesthesiology and pain clinic
- Dermatology
- Internal medicine
- Infectious disease
- Neurology
- Neurosurgery
- Obstetrics and gynecology
- Ophthalmology
- Oral surgery
- Orthopedic surgery
- Otorhinolaryngology
- Pathology
- Pediatrics
- Plastic and reconstructive surgery
- Psychiatry
- Radiology
- Rehabilitation
- Surgery
- Urology

== See also ==
- List of hospitals in Japan
