= Japan Academy Prize (academics) =

Prize awarded by the Japan Academy

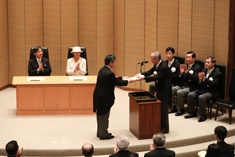
The Award Ceremony for the Imperial Prize and Japan Academy Prize (at the Building of Japan Academy on June 17, 2019)

The Japan Academy Prize (日本学士院賞) is a prize awarded by the Japan Academy in recognition of academic theses, books, and achievements.

== Overviews ==
An award ceremony has been held every year since 1911. Up to nine of these Prizes are awarded every year. There have been 676 winners and 592 winning works as of 2005. They comprise a certificate, medal, and prize money of one million yen.

== Ceremony ==
The ceremony is held on the premises of the Japan Academy in Ueno park. The Emperor has been visiting it since 1949. The three prizes awarded during the ceremony are:

- The Imperial Prize
- Japan Academy Prize
- Duke of Edinburgh Prize

After the ceremony some laureates give lectures on the topics of their research.

== Recipients ==
- 2025
  - Kensō Soai
- 2020
  - Minoru Ozima
- 2016 (106th)
  - Kazutoshi Mori
  - Yoshihiro Kawaoka
- 2015 (105th)
  - Hideo Hosono
  - Hiroaki Mitsuya
- 2014 (104th)
  - Isamu Akasaki
  - Takao Kondo
  - Hiraku Nakajima
- 2013 (103rd)
  - Yoshinori Tokura
- 2012 (102nd)
  - Takaaki Kajita
  - Shimon Sakaguchi
- 2011 (101st)
  - Takurō Mochizuki – "Study of pure twister D-modules"
- 2010 (100th)
  - Shinya Yamanaka
- 2008 (98th)
  - Keiji Morokuma – "Theoretical Studies of Design of Structure, Function and Reactivity of Molecules"
  - Takaya Hosoka – "The Persecution of Jews and Christians in the Early Roman Principate"
  - Fumio Ohtake – "Inequality in Japan"
  - Yoshinori Fujiyoshi – "Structure Determination of Membrane Proteins based on the Development of an Innovative Cryo-Electron Microscope"
  - Naomasa Nakai – Study of Active Galactic Nuclei and Super-Massive Black Holes based on VLBI Observations of Water-Vapor Maser Emission
  - Akira Hasegawa – "Discovery of Optical Soliton Properties in Fibers and of Self-organization of Plasma Turbulence"
  - Kanji Ohyama – "Gene Content, Organization and Molecular Evolution of Plant Organellar Genomes and Sex Chromosomes —Insights from the Case of the Liverwort Marchantia polymorpha—"
  - Kenji Kangawa – "Discovery of Novel Bioactive Peptides with Special Reference to Ghrelin"
  - Yoshiyuki Nagai – "Elucidation of the Molecular Basis of Paramyxovirus Pathogenicity and Generation of a Novel Class of Expression Vector"
- 2007 (97th)
  - Senzô Hidemura – Agriculture and Society at the Last Stage of Satsuma Feudal Fief —A Study of Moriya Family, a Rural Warrior in Kōyama-Gō—
  - Shizuo Akira -Pathogen Recognition by Innate Immunity and its Signaling
  - Masaaki Sugiyama – The Mongol Empire and Dai-ön Ulus
  - Asahiko Taira – Accretion Tectonics and Evolution of the Japan Islands
  - Shinji Kawaji – Experimental Studies of Two-Dimensional Electron Systems"
  - Hisashi Yamamoto and Kohei Tamao – Exploitation of Chemical and Physical Properties of Main-group Element Compounds based on Flexibility for High Coordination (Joint Research)
  - Yukio Hori and Koji Kato – Studies on Tribology (Joint Research)
  - Toshisuke Maruyama – Water Demand-Supply Analysis in Large Spatial Areas Based on Evapotranspiration and Runoff
  - Yasushi Miyashita – The Discovery of Associative Memory Neurons in the Cerebral Cortex and Studies of the Cognitive Memory System
- 2006 (96th)
  - Shuh Narumiya – Studies on the Prostaglandin Receptors
  - Shinsaku Iwahara -Electronic Payment and Law
  - Kotaro Suzumura -Welfare Economics beyond Welfarist-consequentialism
  - Noboru Mataga – Studies on Molecular Interactions and Chemical Reaction Dynamics of Photo-excited Molecules
  - Yoshinori Ohsumi -Molecular Mechanism and Physiological Function of Autophagy
  - Atsuto Suzuki -Studies of Antineutrino Science
  - Ken Sakamura -Research on the Computer Architecture with High Real-time Performance
  - Koki Horikoshi -Studies of Alkaliphilic Microorganisms: Their Diversity, Physiology, and Applications
  - Toshio Wagai -Studies on the Foundation and Development of Diagnostic Ultrasound
- 2005 (95th)
  - Kazuya Kato
  - Tetsuya Shiokawa for "Recherches sur Pascal" ("Research on Arithmetic Geometry")
  - Shuichiro Kimura for "A History of the German Idea of Welfare State"
  - Yukihiko Kiyokawa for "Formation of Modern Industrial Labor Force in Asia — Economic Development, Culture and Job Consciousness"
  - Takashi Nakamura for "Theoretical Investigation of the Formation of Black Holes and the Emission of Gravitational Waves"
  - Hiroyuki Sakaki and Hideo Ohno for "Studies on Quantum Control of Electrons by Semiconductor Nanostructures and Ferromagnetism"
  - Hiroshi Kida for "Studies on Control of Influenza — Mechanism of Emergence of Pandemic Influenza Virus Strains in Poultry, Domestic Animals and Humans, and Molecular Basis of the Neutralization of Viral Infectivity with Antibodies"
  - Yukihiko Kitamura for "Development and Malignant Transformation of Mast Cells and Interstitial Cells of Cajal through KIT Receptors"
  - Masakatsu Shibasaki for "Studies on the Development of Asymmetric Catalysts and its Application to Medicinal Chemistry"
- 2004 (94th)
  - Takafusa Nakamura
  - Hiroo Kanamori
  - Akira Suzuki
  - Akira Fujishima
- 2003 (93rd)
  - Mitsuhiro Yanagida – Regulation of Cell Cycle and Chromosome Segregation
  - Noboru Karashima – History and Society in South India: The Cholas to Vijayanagar
  - Mari Nomura – The Jews in Vienna
  - Kenji Fukaya – Research in Differential Geometry
  - Koichi Itoh, Hiizu Iwamura and Minoru Kinoshita – Study of Molecular Magnet (Joint Research)
  - Yasutoshi Senoo – Researches on Fluid Dynamics of Centrifugal Turbomachines
  - Yoshimi Okada – Molecular Biology of Plant Virus RNA Genomes and its Application to Agriculture
  - Hiroshi Okamoto – Studies on Experimental Diabetes and Its Prevention
  - Makoto Endo – Studies on the Mechanisms of Mobilization of Calcium Ion in Muscle Cells
- 2002 (92nd)
  - Sumio Iijima
  - Akiho Miyashiro
- 2001 (91st)
  - Fumio Hayashi
  - Makoto Asashima
- 2000 (90th)
  - Shigekazu Nagata
  - Morikazu Toda
  - Tadatsugu Taniguchi
- 1999 (89th)
  - Yoshito Kishi
  - Nobutaka Hirokawa
- 1998 (88th)
  - Toshio Yanagida
  - Yasutaka Ihara
- 1997 (87th)
  - Shigetada Nakanishi
  - Norio Kaifu
- 1996 (86th)
  - Tasuku Honjo
  - Shinzo Watanabe
  - Masatoshi Takeichi
- 1995 (85th)
  - Ryōji Noyori
  - Shun'ichi Amari
- 1994 (84th)
  - Makoto Kumada
- 1993 (83rd)
  - Issei Tanaka – "A Study of the Ritual Theatres in China"
  - Yasuo Tanaka – "The Relativistic Properties of Celestial X-ray Sources"
  - Takashi Negishi – "History of Economic Theory"
  - Akito Arima – "Theoretical Studies on Dynamical Models and Electromagnetic Interactions of Atomic Nuclei"
  - Michio Jimbo – "Studies on Solvable Lattice Models and Quantum Groups"
  - Takanori Okoshi – "Research on Coherent Optical Fiber Communications"
  - Toshiro Kinoshita – "Genetical Studies on the Interaction between Cytoplasmic and Nuclear Genomes, and the Application of These Studies to Actual Crop Breeding"
  - Hajime Yamamoto – "Use of Lasers for Caries Prevention and Other Applications in Dentistry"
  - Keiya Tada and Goro Kikuchi – "Studies on Hyperglycinemia (Joint Research)"
- 1992 (82nd)
  - Tadamitsu Kishimoto
  - Kenichi Honda
- 1991 (81st)
  - Akira Tonomura
  - Tomisaku Kawasaki
- 1990 (80th)
  - Koji Nakanishi
  - Masahiko Aoki
  - Shigeru Iitaka, Shigefumi Mori, Yujiro Kawamata
  - Satoshi Ōmura
- 1989 (79th)
  - Sengaku Mayeda
  - Masatoshi Koshiba
- 1988 (78th)
  - Masaki Kashiwara
- 1986 (76th)
  - Masao Ito
  - Masayoshi Nagata
  - Hitoshi Nozaki
  - Yasutomi Nishizuka
- 1985 (75th)
  - Toshihide Maskawa, Makoto Kobayashi
  - Tomoko Ohta
  - Yoshiaki Arata
  - Shosaku Numa
- 1984 (74th)
  - Zuiho Yamaguchi
- 1982 (72nd)
  - Shizuo Kakutani
- 1979 (69th)
  - Hiroshi Inose
- 1978 (68th)
  - Kiyosi Itô
- 1977 (67th)
  - Yoshimasa Hirata
  - Syun-Ichi Akasofu
- 1976 (66th)
  - Takashi Sugimura
  - Mikio Sato
  - Tamio Yamakawa
- 1974 (64th)
  - Kimishige Ishizaka
  - Michio Suzuki
  - Jun-ichi Nishizawa
- 1973 (63rd)
  - Jun Kondo
  - Sasagu Arai
- 1972 (62nd)
  - Setsuro Ebashi
- 1971 (61st)
  - Chushiro Hayashi
- 1970 (60th)
  - Susumu Nakanishi
  - Chushiro Hayashi
  - Heisuke Hironaka
- 1968 (58th)
  - Motoo Kimura
- 1967 (57th)
  - Osamu Hayaishi
- 1965 (55th)
  - Hiroshi Tamiya
  - Leo Esaki
- 1964 (54th)
  - Kazuhiko Nishijima
- 1962 (52nd)
  - Kenkichi Iwasawa
  - Kenichi Fukui
  - Hamao Umezawa
- 1961 (51st)
  - Shigeo Kishibe
- 1959 (49th)
  - Tatsuo Nishida
- 1958 (48th)
  - Motoo Kimura
- 1957 (47th)
  - Kanda Nobuo
  - Kunihiko Kodaira
- 1956 (46th)
  - Takahiko Yamanouchi
- 1954 (44th)
  - Tadashi Nakayama
  - Hisashi Kuno
- 1953 (43rd)
  - Guan Jing
- 1952 (42nd)
  - Hideyo Arisaka
- 1951 (41st)
  - Kiyoshi Oka
  - Takeshi Nagata
- 1950 (40th)
  - Yūkichi Takeda
  - Kinichiro Sakaguchi
- 1949 (39th)
  - Kenjiro Shoda
- 1948 (38th)
  - Issac Koga
  - Masao Kotani
- 1945 (35th)
  - Kinpei Matsuoka
- 1941 (31st)
  - Seiichi Iwao
  - Shinobu Ishihara
  - Ukichiro Nakaya
- 1940 (30th)
  - Mokichi Saitō
- 1937 (27th)
  - Ryōzō Kanehira
- 1932 (22nd)
  - Motonori Matuyama
  - Shintaro Uda
  - Seishi Kikuchi
- 1931 (21st)
  - Hakaru Masumoto
- 1930 (20th)
  - Okuro Oikawa
- 1929 (19th)
  - Hisao Tanabe
  - Kenzo Futaki
- 1928 (18th)
  - Yuzuru Hiraga
- 1927 (17th)
  - Takenoshin Nakai
  - Keizo Dohi
  - Gen'ichi Katō
- 1926 (16th)
  - Tomonobu Ishibashi
  - Shitsuzo Kuwabara
- 1925 (15th)
  - Shinkishi Hatai
- 1924 (14th)
  - Kiichiro Soda
  - Rinya Kawamura
  - Umetaro Suzuki
  - Katsumi Takahashi
- 1923 (13th)
  - No award
- 1922 (12th)
  - Kenji Kiyono
  - Kyoji Suehiro
- 1921 (11th)
  - Hikoshichiro Matsumoto
  - Kuniichi Tawara
- 1920 (10th)
  - Seigai Omura
  - Sakuhei Fujiwhara
  - Bunzō Hayata
- 1919 (9th)
  - Tadamune Takada
  - Katsusaburō Yamagiwa
  - Koichi Ichikawa
  - Tokiji Ishikawa
- 1918 (8th)
  - Fujiro Katsurada
  - Akira Fujinami
- 1917 (7th)
  - Riko Majima
  - Shoji Nishikawa
- 1916 (6th)
  - Wuichi Torigata
  - Tsunetaro Kujirai
  - Eitaro Yokoyama
  - Masajiro Kitamura
  - Kotaro Honda
- 1915 (5th)
  - Kin-in-shoku
  - Kametaro Toyama
- 1914 (4th)
  - Shinichiro Takezoye
  - Shirota Kusakabe
- 1913 (3rd)
  - Seitaro Goto
  - Motoki Kondo
- 1912 (2nd)
  - Jōkichi Takamine

== See also ==
- Imperial Prize of the Japan Academy
