= Tanabe =

Tanabe may refer to:

== People ==
- Chie Tanabe (田邊 智恵, born 1971), Japanese stuntwoman
- Chikara Tanabe (田南部 力, born 1975), Japanese Olympic wrestler
- Daichi Tanabe (田辺 大智, born 2001), Japanese footballer
- Daisuke Tanabe, Japanese electronic musician and music producer
- David Tanabe (born 1980), American professional ice hockey player
- Gou Tanabe (田邊 剛, born 1975), Japanese manga artist
- Hajime Tanabe (田辺 元, 1885–1962), Japanese philosopher of the Kyoto School
- Harumichi Tanabe (田辺 治通, 1879–1950), bureaucrat and cabinet minister in early Shōwa period Japan
- Hi69, Tanabe Hiroki (田辺 裕喜, born 1981), Japanese professional wrestler
- Hisao Tanabe (田辺 尚雄, 1883–1984), Japanese musicologist
- Jūji Tanabe (田部 重治, 1884–1972), Japanese literature scholar, teacher, and mountain climber
- Karin Tanabe, American historical fiction novelist
- Kazuhiko Tanabe (田辺 和彦, born 1981), Japanese footballer
- Keisuke Tanabe (田辺 圭佑, born 1992), Japanese footballer
- Kensuke Tanabe (田邊 賢輔, born 1963), Japanese video game designer, producer and director
- Kiyoshi Tanabe (田辺 清, born 1940), Japanese Olympic boxer
- Kiyoshi Tanabe (tennis), Japanese professional tennis player
- Luke Tanabe, Canadian fashion designer
- Makoto Tanabe (田邊 誠, 1922–2015), Japanese politician
- Masatake Tanabe (田部 正壮, 1849–1939), Mayor of Hiroshima in 1917–1921
- Masato Tanabe, American scientist
- Mataemon Tanabe (田辺 又右衛門, 1869–1946), Japanese martial artist
- Miku Tanabe (田名部 生来, born 1992), Japanese idol
- Moritake Tanabe (田辺 盛武, 1889–1949), Japanese general during World War II
- Nobuhiro Tanabe (田辺 信宏, born 1961), Japanese politician
- Norikazu Tanabe (田部 仁一, born 1970), Japanese fencer
- Norio Tanabe (田辺 徳雄, born 1966), Japanese baseball player, coach, and manager
- Rui Tanabe (田辺 留依, born 1997), Japanese voice actress.
- Ryota Tanabe (田鍋 陵太, born 1993), Japanese football player
- Tanabe no Sakimaro (田辺 福麻呂), Japanese waka poet of the Nara period
- Tanabe Sakuro (田辺 朔郎, 1861–1944), Japanese civil engineer
- Seiichi Tanabe (田辺 誠一, born 1969), Japanese actor
- Seiko Tanabe (田辺 聖子, 1928–2019), Japanese author
- Shuto Tanabe (田邉 秀斗, born 2002), Japanese footballer
- Sonny Tanabe (born 1932), American Olympic competition swimmer
- Sotan Tanabe (田邉 草民, born 1990), Japanese footballer
- Takao Tanabe CM OBC RCA (born 1926), Canadian artist
- Tanabe Tomoji (1895–2009), Japanese supercentenarian
- Toma Tanabe (田辺 斗麗, born 2002), Japanese kickboxer
- Yasunori Tanabe (田辺 保典, born 1967), Japanese rower
- Yellow Tanabe (田辺 イエロウ), Japanese manga artist
- Yoko Tanabe (田辺 陽子, born 1966), Japanese judoka
- Yuki Tanabe (田邉 夕貴, born 1989), Japanese handball player

== Places ==
- Tanabe, Wakayama, Japan
- Tanabe, Kyoto, Japan

== Railway stations ==
- Kii-Tanabe Station, a railway station in Tanabe, Wakayama Prefecture, Japan
- Kita-Tanabe Station, a railway station in Higashisumiyoshi-ku, Osaka, Osaka Prefecture, Japan
- Minami-Tanabe Station, a railway station on the West Japan Railway
- Nishi-Tanabe Station or Nishitanabe Station, a subway station on the Osaka Metro Midosuji Line
- Shin-Tanabe Station, a railway station on Kintetsu Railway's Kyoto Line in Kyōtanabe, Kyoto Prefecture, Japan
- Tanabe Station, a railway station on the Osaka Metro Tanimachi Line in Higashisumiyoshi-ku, Osaka, Japan

== Others ==
- Tanabe Art Museum (Tanabe Bijutsukan), in Matsue, Shimane Prefecture, Japan
- Tanabe Mitsubishi Pharma SC, a Japanese football club based in Osaka
- Siege of Tanabe, a battle in 1600 in Japan
- Ai Tanabe, a fictional character in the manga and anime series Planetes
- Tanabe Hisao Prize, for Asian musicology research
- 6738 Tanabe, a minor planet
