= Shosaku Numa =

Japanese neuroscientist

- 沼 正作
- Born: February 7, 1929; Wakayama, Japan
- Died: February 15, 1992 (aged 63); Kyoto, Japan
- Education: Kyoto University
- Known for: Ion channels
- Awards: Heinrich Wieland Prize (1973); Asahi Prize (1982); Japan Academy Prize (1985); Otto Warburg Medal (1987)
- Scientific career
- Fields: Neuroscience
- Workplaces: Kyoto University; Max Planck Society; Harvard Medical School

Shosaku Numa, ForMemRS (沼 正作, Numa Shousaku; February 7, 1929 – February 15, 1992) was a Japanese neuroscientist known for his pioneering research on neurotransmitters and ion channels, and for his contributions to the understanding of molecular mechanisms of neural signalling.

== Biography ==
Numa was born in Wakayama, Japan and completed his M.D. in 1952 at Kyoto University. He studied at Harvard Medical School with John Lawrence Oncley and worked at the Max Planck Society with Feodor Felix Konrad Lynen, before he became Professor of Medical Chemistry at the Faculty of Medicine, Kyoto University in 1968. He died of colon cancer on February 15, 1992, at the age of 63.

== Contributions ==
Numa and co-workers cloned and sequenced the cDNA and delineated the primary structures of different families of receptors and channels including a neurotransmitter-gated channel (nicotinic acetylcholine receptor), voltage-gated channels (sodium channel and calcium channel), an intracellular membrane channel (calcium-release channel), and a G-protein-coupled receptor (muscarinic acetylcholine receptor).

== Recognition ==
For his great achievements, Numa was awarded numerous honours and awards including, most outstandingly, the Japan Academy Prize in 1985. He was elected as a foreign member of the Royal Society in 1986, as a member of the German Academy of Natural Scientists Leopoldina in 1990, and as a foreign associate of the National Academy of Sciences of the United States of America in 1991. He was selected as a Person of Cultural Merit by the Government of Japan in 1991.
