= Shirota =

Shirota is a Japanese surname. Notable people with the surname include:

- Atsushi Shirota (代田 敦資, Shirota Atsushi, born 1991), Japanese footballer
- Yu Shirota (城田 優, Shirota Yū, born 1985), Japanese actor and singer
- Minoru Shirota (代田 稔, Shirota Minoru, 1899–1982), Japanese microbiologist and inventor of Yakult, a yogurt-like probiotic drink containing Lactobacillus casei strain Shirota
- Shirōta Kusakabe (日下部 四郎太, Kusakabe Shirōta, 1875–1924), Japanese geophysicist
