= Shigeo Kishibe =

Shigeo Kishibe (岸辺 成雄, Kishibe Shigeo, June 6, 1912 – January 4, 2005) was a Japanese musicologist specializing in the study of East Asian music.

== Life ==
Kishibe was born in Tokyo in the district of Kanda-Jinbōchō, to Fukuo Kishibe, an educator and children's writer. He was first exposed to music through music in his father's stories, and made his first record and stage appearance at age 9 (by East Asian age reckoning) and first appeared on the radio at age 14. As a teenager, he became fascinated by Asian history. At this time he also met the eminent scholar of Japanese and Asian music Hisao Tanabe. In April 1933, he enrolled at the Tokyo Imperial University Division of Asiatic History of the Faculty of Letters, studying under Hiroshi Ikeuchi. He graduated in 1936, with a graduate thesis on modal systems of popular music of the Sui and Tang Dynasties.

Upon graduation, he co-founded (with Tadasumi Iida) a new academic society for the study of Asian music, the Tōyō Ongaku Gakkai (Society for Research in Asiatic Music). During this period he was supported by grants from the Imperial Academy and the Keimei Foundation and was active in colonial field research in Korea (visited in 1941) and China (visited in 1943). Upon these visits, he encountered the surviving aak and yayue forms, as well as popular theatrical and instrumental forms. In the 1940s, he taught senior high school and lectured in Asian and Japanese music history.

From 1949 to 1973, he taught at the University of Tokyo, first as an associate professor, as a full professor after 1961, and becoming Emeritus Professor upon retiring. In this retirement, he continued to teach as a professor at Teikyo University until 1994. He also lectured at numerous other universities, including Tokyo National University of Fine Arts and Music, Soai Women's University, Niigata University, Hirosaki University, and Waseda University. He was also a research fellow at Tokyo National Research Institute for Cultural Properties. In 1957–58, 1962–63, and 1973–74, he visited the United States and held visiting positions at Harvard University, University of California Los Angeles, University of Hawaii, University of Washington, and Stanford University. He also held advisory positions with several international organizations for music research. In 1982, he was invested with the Order of the Rising Sun, 3rd class.

He married Yori Sasaki in 1941 and they had three children together. She was an eminent koto and shamisen player in her own right, and was awarded the Order of the Sacred Treasure, fourth class in 1992.

== Research ==
His book on the musical institutions of the Tang dynasty, Tōdai ongaku no rekishiteki kenkyū: Gakusei-hen 唐代音楽の歴史的研究, was awarded the Japan Academy Prize in 1961. His last book, Edo jidai no kin-shi monogatari 江戸時代の琴士物語 [Tales of qin (guqin) players during the Edo period], was awarded the Tanabe Hisao Prize.

Although most of his research was historical in nature and dealt with very old music, he also conducted fieldwork in various regions in Japan, China, and other parts of Asia. To his students, he emphasized the importance of having practical experience performing the music one studies. He himself played gagaku (the shō and the hichiriki), the nōkan, nagauta, itchu-būshi, and the Chinese guqin.
