= Shatakshee Dhongde =

College Professor and Economics Researcher

- Born: Shatakshee Ramesh Dhongde

Academic background
- Education: University of California, Riverside

Academic work
- Discipline: Microeconomic theory and development economics
- Institutions: Ivan Allen College of Liberal Arts, Georgia Institute of Technology
- Awards: University of California, Riverside Graduate Research Award; The Nancy and Richard Ruggles Research Prize

Notes
- Thesis Essays on growth, income distribution and poverty. (2005)

Shatakshee Ramesh Dhongde is an associate professor at the School of Economics, Ivan Allen College of Liberal Arts, Georgia Institute of Technology. She has provided research papers to the several institutions including the International Monetary Fund and the World Institute for Development Economics Research (WIDER). Her work has also appeared in several academic journals including World Development.

Dhongde's research interests are in microeconomics and development economics and include inequality, growth, trade liberalization, poverty, and segregation.

== Education ==
Dhongde gained her degree in economics from the University of Pune, India (1997), her masters in economics from Gokhale Institute of Politics and Economics, also in Pune, India (1999), and her Ph.D. in economics from the University of California, Riverside, in the United States (2005).

== Career ==
After completing her PhD, Dhongde remained at the University of California, Riverside for a further year as a lecturer. In 2006 she became assistant professor at Rochester Institute of Technology, Rochester, New York. Dhongde became assistant professor at Georgia Institute of Technology, Atlanta in 2011.

Dhongde was also a visiting scholar at the United Nations University-World Institute for Development Economics Research (UNU-WIDER) in Helsinki from June to September 2002.

== Awards ==
- 2005 University of California, Riverside Graduate Research Award
- 2012 The Nancy and Richard Ruggles Research Prize presented by the International Association for Research in Income and Wealth (IARIW)

== Bibliography ==
=== Thesis ===
- Dhongde, Shatakshee (2005). Essays on growth, income distribution and poverty (PhD thesis). University of California, Riverside. OCLC 63761888.

=== Chapters in books ===
External videos
- Talk by Shatakshee Dhongde
- Technology, Development Economics, and Human Rights via Sam Nunn School of International Affairs @ Georgia Tech on YouTube

- Dhongde, Shatakshee; Pattanaik, Prasanta K. (2009), "Preference, choice, and rationality: Amartya Sen's critique of the theory of rational choice in economics", in Morris, Christopher (ed.), Amartya Sen, Contemporary Philosophy in Focus., Cambridge, New York: Cambridge University Press, pp. 13–39, doi:10.1017/CBO9780511800511.003, ISBN 9780521618069
- Dhongde, Shatakshee (2010), "Measuring global poverty", in Denemark, Robert A. (ed.), The international studies encyclopedia, Volume VII: In-La, International Law and Armed Conflict – Labor Migrations and the Global Political Economy, Malden, Massachusetts: International Studies Association and Wiley-Blackwell, doi:10.1093/acrefore/9780190846626.013.259, ISBN 9781405152389.

=== Journal articles ===
- Dhongde, Shatakshee (June 2007). "Measuring the impact of growth and income distribution on poverty in India". Journal of Income Distribution. 16 (2): 25–48. doi:10.25071/1874-6322.5568. S2CID 15346340.
- Dhongde, Shatakshee; Bao, Yong (April 2009). "Testing convergence in income distribution". Oxford Bulletin of Economics and Statistics. 71 (2): 295–302. doi:10.1111/j.1468-0084.2008.00514.x. S2CID 154704660.
- Dhongde, Shatakshee; Minoiu, Camelia (October 2010). "Global poverty estimates: present and future". SSRN 1670841.
- Dhongde, Shatakshee; Chambers, Dustin (December 2011). "A non-parametric measure of poverty elasticity". The Review of Income and Wealth. 57 (4): 683–703. doi:10.1111/j.1475-4991.2011.00446.x. S2CID 154275252.
- Dhongde, Shatakshee; Minoiu, Camelia (April 2013). "Global poverty estimates: a sensitivity analysis". World Development. 44: 1–13. doi:10.1016/j.worlddev.2012.12.010. hdl:1853/44247.
- Dhongde, Shatakshee; Haveman, Robert (March 2015). "Poverty index: an application to the United States". SSRN 2588584.

=== Papers ===
- Dhongde, Shatakshee (2002). Measuring the impact of growth and income distribution on poverty in India (PDF). Working paper.
- Dhongde, Shatakshee (August 2004). Decomposing spatial differences in poverty in India. UNU-WIDER. Pdf ISBN 9291906425 Research paper 2004/53.
- Dhongde, Shatakshee (2005). Essays on growth, income distribution and poverty (Ph.D.). University of California, Riverside. OCLC 63761888.
- Dhongde, Shatakshee (March 2005). "Spatial decomposition of poverty in India" (Word doc). Spatial Inequality in Asia.
- Dhongde, Shatakshee (2008). Effects of trade liberalization on the distribution of factor income. Working paper.
- Dhongde, Shatakshee; Minoiu, Camelia (October 2010). Global poverty estimates: present and future. Manchester: Brooks World Poverty Institute (BWPI), University of Manchester. ISBN 9781907247323. Pdf. BWPI working paper 133, prepared for the Chronic Poverty Research Centre (CPRC) Conference, 8–10 September 2010.
- Dhongde, Shatakshee; Minoiu, Camelia (2011). Global poverty estimates: a sensitivity analysis, volumes 11-234 of IMF working paper. Washington, DC: International Monetary Fund. Pdf. ISBN 9781463922009 Working paper 11/234.
- Dhongde, Shatakshee (2011). A poverty segregation curve (PDF). School of Economics, Ivan Allen College, Georgia Institute of Technology. Spring Seminar Series.
- Dhongde, Shatakshee (2012). Measuring segregation of the poor (PDF). School of Economics, Ivan Allen College, Georgia Institute of Technology. Spring Seminar Series.
- Dhongde, Shatakshee (2012). Measuring segregation of the poor in India (PDF). Paper prepared for the 32nd General Conference of The International Association for Research in Income and Wealth (IARIW).
- Dhongde, Shatakshee; Miao, Xing (March 2013). Cross-country convergence in income inequality. Society for the Study of Economic Inequality. Pdf. Working paper no. 290.
- Dhongde, Shatakshee; Silber, Jacques (2014). Distributional change, pro-poor growth and convergence: an application to non-income dimensions (PDF). Paper prepared for the 33rd General Conference of The International Association for Research in Income and Wealth (IARIW).

== Videos ==
- Danny Boston (moderator), Kirk Bowman, Michael L Best, Olga Shemyakina, Shatakshee Dhongde (2013). Poverty, Inequality, and Development (video). SOAR: Symposium on Opportunity and Access Research. MP4 download or view online. A workshop-style mini-retreat on common areas of research within Ivan Allen College (IAC), Georgia Institute of Technology.
- Shatakshee Dhongde, Olga Shemyakina and Margaret Kosal (14 October 2014). Technology, Development Economics, and Human Rights, October 3, 2014 (YouTube). Sam Nunn School of International Affairs @ Georgia Tech.
