= Kotaro Suzumura =

Japanese economist (1944–2020)

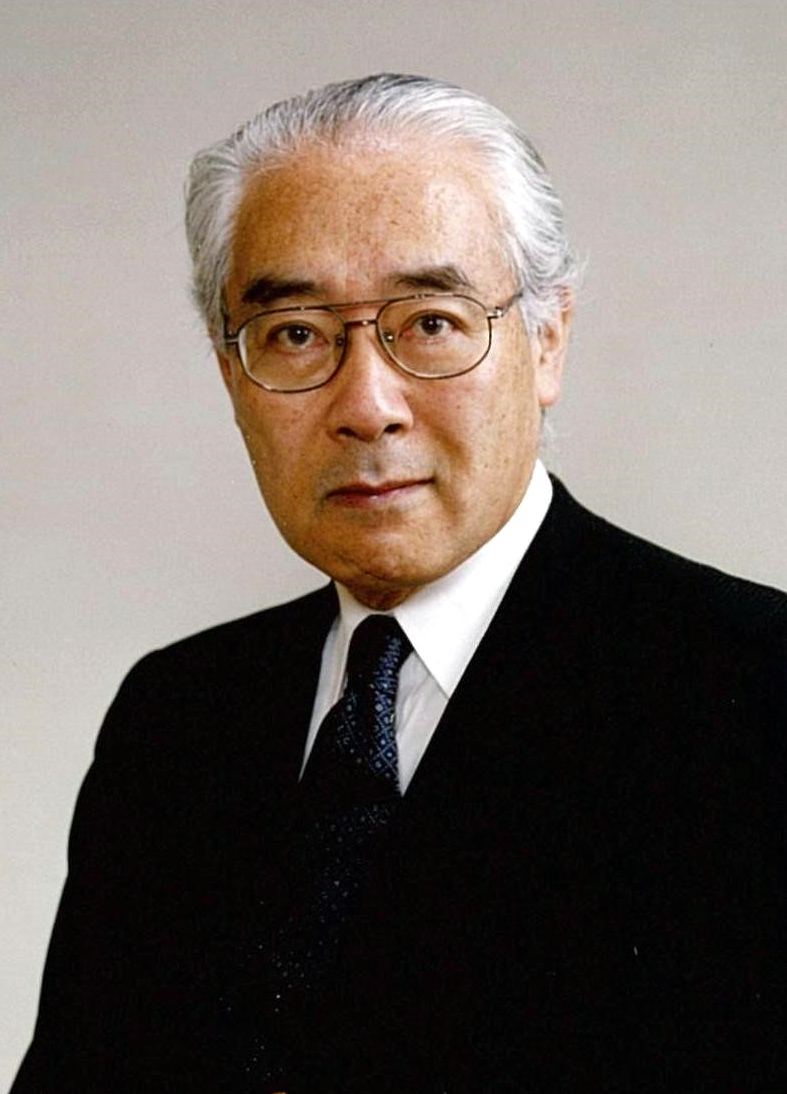
- Kotaro Suzumura
- Born: 7 January 1944; Tokoname, Aichi, Japan
- Died: 15 January 2020 (aged 76)

Academic background
- Education: Hitotsubashi University

Kotaro Suzumura (鈴村 興太郎, Suzumura Kōtarō; 7 January 1944 – 15 January 2020) was a Japanese economist and professor emeritus of Hitotsubashi University and Waseda University. He graduated from Hitotsubashi University in 1966. His research interests were in social choice theory and welfare economics. He was also a Fellow of the Econometric Society. He was named a Person of Cultural Merit in 2017.

== Selected publications ==
=== Books ===
- Suzumura, Kōtarō (1983). Rational choice, collective decisions, and social welfare. Cambridge Cambridgeshire New York: Cambridge University Press. ISBN 9780521122559.
- Suzumura, Kōtarō (1995). Competition, commitment, and welfare. Oxford New York: Clarendon Press. ISBN 9780198289142.
- Suzumura, Kōtarō; Basu, Kaushik; Pattanaik, Prasanta (1995). Choice, welfare, and development: a festschrift in honour of Amartya K. Sen. Oxford New York: Clarendon Press Oxford University Press. ISBN 9780198287896.
- Suzumura, Kōtarō; Sen, Amartya; Arrow, Kenneth J. (1996). Social choice re-examined: proceedings of the IEA conference held at Schloss Hernstein, Berndorf, near Vienna, Austria. Vol. 2 (1st ed.). New York, N.Y: St. Martin's Press. ISBN 9780312127398.
- Suzumura, Kōtarō; Sen, Amartya; Arrow, Kenneth J. (2002). Handbook of social choice and welfare. Amsterdam Boston: Elsevier. ISBN 9780444829146.

=== Chapters in books ===
- Suzumura, Kōtarō; Bossert, Walter (2009), "Rational choice on general domains", in Kanbur, Ravi; Basu, Kaushik (eds.), Arguments for a better world: essays in honor of Amartya Sen | Volume I: Ethics, welfare, and measurement, Oxford New York: Oxford University Press, pp. 103–135, ISBN 9780199239115.

=== Journal articles ===
- Suzumura, Kōtarō; Pattanaik, Prasanta K. (April 1996). "Individual rights and social evaluation: a conceptual framework". Oxford Economic Papers. 48 (2). Oxford University Press: 194–212. doi:10.1093/oxfordjournals.oep.a028565.

== See also ==
- Extended sympathy
- Social welfare function
