= Sengaku Mayeda =

Japanese writer, philosopher and teacher (1931–2026)

- Born: 1 April 1931; Nagoya, Japan
- Died: 22 August 2026 (aged 95)
- Occupation: Writer
- Awards: Padma Shri; Third Order of Merit with the Middle Cordon of the Rising Sun; Buddhagunupakan Kancanakiartigun – Highest Decoration of Excellence; Japanese Association of Indian and Buddhist Studies Award; Academic Achievement Award; Japan Academy Award; Excellent Book Award

Sengaku Mayeda (Japanese: 前田專學, romanized: Maeda Sengaku; 1 April 1931 – 22 August 2026) was a Japanese writer, philosopher and teacher, known for his writings on Indian philosophy and Adi Shankara. He was honoured by the Government of India, in 2014, by bestowing on him the Padma Shri, the fourth highest civilian award, for his services to the fields of literature and education. He is the fourth Japanese to be honoured with Padma Shri, after Taro Nakayama, Shoji Shiba and Noboru Karashima. He is also a recipient of the Third Order of Merit with the Middle Cordon of the Rising Sun of the Government of Japan, which he received in 2002.

== Life and career ==
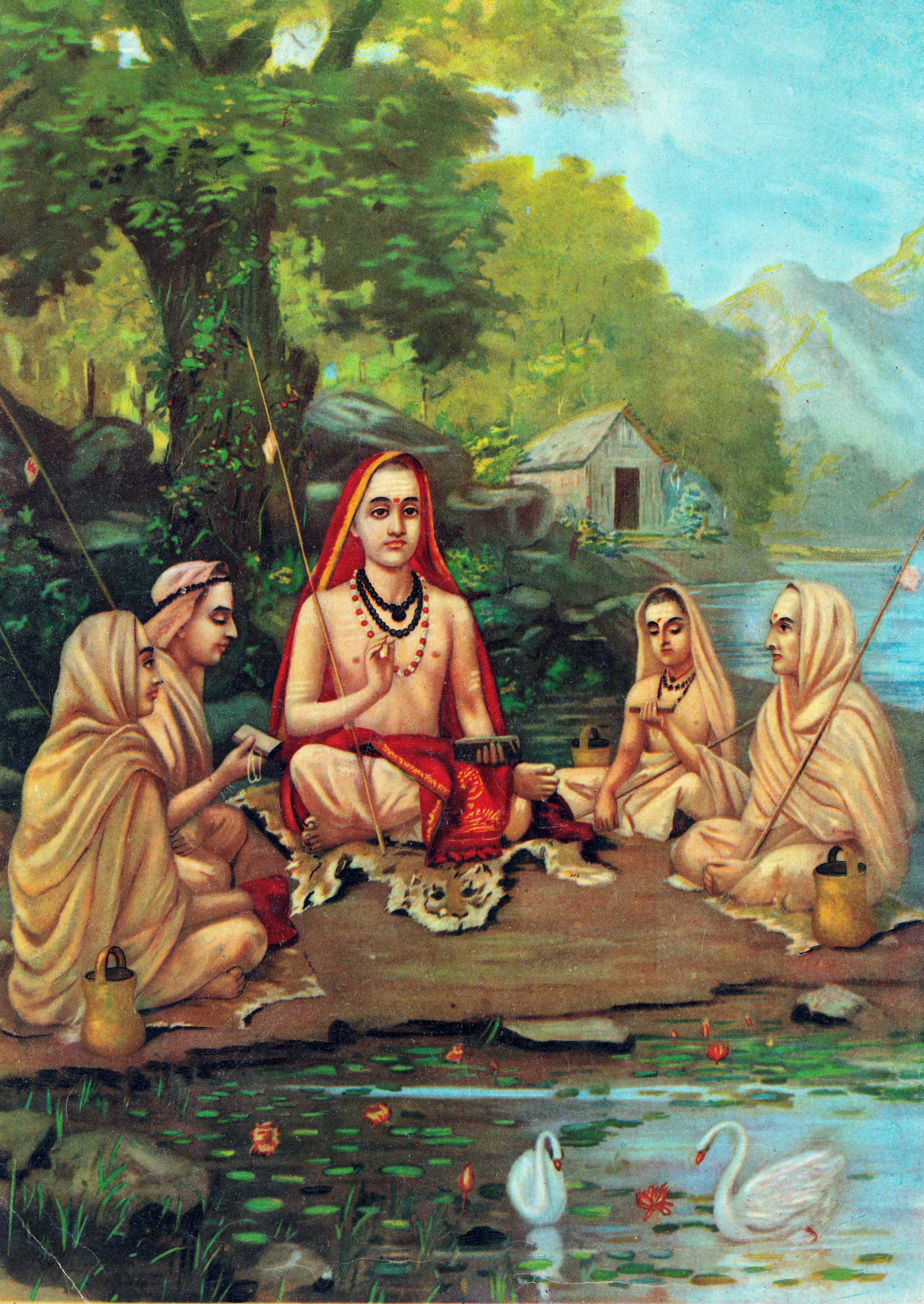
Adi Shankara - Raja Ravi Varma painting

Sengaku Mayeda was born on 1 April 1931 in Nagoya, in the prefecture of Aichi, Japan. He did his pre-graduate studies at the College of General Education, in Tokyo and graduated with BA from the Department of Indian Philosophy and Buddhist Studies, Faculty of Letters, University of Tokyo, in 1955. He continued his post graduate studies at the University of Tokyo and secured his MA from the Department of Indian Philosophy, Division of Humanities, in 1957.

He obtained a doctorate degree from the University of Tokyo in 1962. This was followed by another doctoral degree, Doctor of Philosophy, from the University of Pennsylvania, under Professor W. Norman Brown in Rigveda and Sanskrit, in the same year and, later, Doctor of Literature from University of Tokyo in 1973.

In 1961, Mayeda became a Harrison Research Fellow at the University of Pennsylvania. A year later, he got the Faculty Research Fellowship of the American Institute of Indian Studies of University of Madras where he had the opportunity to associate with philosopher T. M. P. Mahadevan. The next year, he got the Alexander von Humboldt-Stiftung fellowship and worked along with Paul Hacker at the University of Münster, West Germany.

Mayeda started his teaching career in 1964, joining the University of Pennsylvania as the assistant professor of Indian Philosophy. In 1968, he returned to Japan to become the Director of the Research Division of Suzuki Research Foundation in Tokyo where he worked till 1973. The next assignment was as the assistant professor of Indian Philosophy at University of Tokyo. He retired as Professor in 1991.

After retirement, Mayeda was offered the post of the Professor of Indian Philosophy at Musashino Women's University. Three years later, he became the Vice President and worked there till 1998. He continued as the Professor at the university till 2001 when he gave up on regular teaching.

He held many other posts related to philosophy and Indo-Japanese relations. He was a Director of the Indo-Japanese Association since 1983. He was the President of the Japanese Association of Indian and Buddhist Studies for two terms, first from 1991 to 1995 and then from 1998 to 2002. He was the Chairman of the Graduate School of Human and Cultural Studies at the Musashino Women's University from 1999 to 2001. He also served as a member of the Steering Committee of Japan-India Friendship Year of the Japanese Ministry of Foreign Affairs. He also worked as a member of the Steering Committee of the Federation Internationale des Societies Philosophie from 2003 to 2008.

Mayeda held the posts of the executive director of the Eastern Institute, founded by Hajime Nakamura, the Chairman of Japan-India Academic Exchange in Humanities and Social Sciences and the President of the Ashikaga Gakko, Ashikaga.

Mayeda died on 22 August 2026, at the age of 95.

== Publications ==
Mayeda wrote extensively about Adi Shakara and the Indian philosophies, by way of published books and articles. Among them, "Thousand Teachings: The Upadesasahasri of Sankara", in two volumes, is considered his most important work. The book is a critical study of 27 poetic and 11 prose manuscripts, translated into English by the author.

Some of Mayeda's publications are:

Book-author

- Sangeku Mayeda (1 January 1965). The Authenticity of the Upadeshasahasri ascribed to Sankara. See Description. ASIN B005PJBT1U.
- Sengaku Mayeda (Editor/Translator), John M. Koller (Editor/Translator) (31 January 1992). Thousand Teachings: The Upadesasahasri of Sankara. New York: State University of New York Press. pp. 288. ISBN 9780791409442.
- Sengaku Mayeda; Masahiro Shimoda (1 June 2010). Spread and Influence of Hinduism and Buddhism in Asia. Low Price Publications. ISBN 978-8184540987.

Book-editor

- Sengaku Mayeda, ed. (1 January 2000). Way to Liberation: Indological Studies in Japan Vol.1. Manohar Publishers and Distributors. p. 289. ISBN 978-8173043741.
- Y Matsunami, M Tokunaga, H Marui Edited By: Sengaku Mayeda (Author) (2001). Way to Liberation. Manohar Publishers (IND). ISBN 978-81-7304-374-1.

Articles

- Sangeku Mayeda. NANJO BUNYU: An entry from Macmillan Reference USA's Encyclopedia of Religion.
- Mayeda, Sengaku (2000), Remembering Dr. Hajime Nakamura. In: Philosophy East and West, Vol. 50, Number 3. (July 2000). University of Hawaii Press. P.Y. pp.IV-VIII, archived from the original on 16 June 2014

He was also a prolific writer of journal articles and regularly gave lectures on the subject.

== Positions held ==
Mayeda was the professor emeritus, University of Tokyo and Musashino University. He has also held many other roles.

- President of Ashikaga Gakko, Ashikaga
- Director of Japanese Association of Indian and Buddhist Studies
- Director of Association of Buddhist Thought
- Councilor of Japanese Association of Religious Studies
- Chairman of Editorial Committee of the English Tripitaka
- Chairman of Society for the Promotion of Buddhism
- President of Nakamura Hajime Eastern Institute, Tokyo
- Director of Nakamura Hajime Memorial Hall, Matsue, Shimane Prefecture
- Advisor of Indo-Japanese Association
- Director of Indo-Japanese Association
- Special Advisor of the Sanin-India Association and Buddhist Studies

== Awards and recognitions ==
- Padma Shri – Government of India – 2014
- Third Order of Merit with the Middle Cordon of the Rising Sun – Government of Japan – 2002
- Buddhagunupakan Kancanakiartigun – Highest Decoration of Excellence – House of Representatives, Kingdom of Thailand
- Japanese Association of Indian and Buddhist Studies Award
- Academic Achievement Award – Nakamura Hajime Eastern Institute
- Japan Academy Prize
- Excellent Book Award – Tokyu Kagami Foundation

He was a research fellow of the Chinese Academy of Social Sciences, Beijing, China and was a recipient of Doctorate of Literarture (Honoris Causa) from the Buddhasravaka Bhiksu University, Sri Lanka.

== See also ==
- Adi Shankara
- Advaita Vedanta
