= Nobutaka Hirokawa =

Japanese neuroscientist and cell biologist

- 廣川 信隆
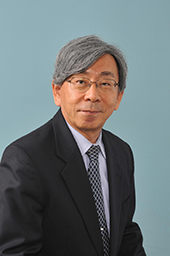
- Born: March 25, 1942; Yokosuka, Kanagawa, Japan
- Education: University of Tokyo
- Known for: Kinesin; Electron Microscopy
- Awards: Japan Academy Prize (1999); Asahi Prize (1995); Eduard Buchner Prize (2005); Order of Culture (2024)
- Scientific career
- Fields: Neuroscience; Cell Biology
- Workplaces: University of Tokyo; Washington University in St. Louis; University of California, San Francisco
- Doctoral advisor: Junnosuke Nakai

Nobutaka Hirokawa (廣川 信隆, Hirokawa Nobutaka) (born March 25, 1946) is a Japanese neuroscientist and cell biologist famous for research on the kinesin superfamily of motor proteins. He has been President and Chair of the Board of Trustees at the Human Frontier Science Program since 2012.

== Contribution ==
Hirokawa's work is mostly focused on the molecular mechanisms involved in transporting materials within nerve cells, in particular in his discovery of many of the functions of the Kinesin superfamily of molecular motors.

== Biography ==
Hirokawa was born in Yokosuka, Kanagawa and received his M.D. in 1971 and his Ph.D. in 1978 from The University of Tokyo in Japan; from 1979 to 1983 he served as a Postdoctoral Fellow at University of California, San Francisco and as a research Assistant professor and an associate professor at Washington University in St. Louis. On returning to Japan, he was appointed Professor and Chairman of Cell Biology and Anatomy at the Graduate School of Medicine, The University of Tokyo, where he served as the Dean from 2003 to 2007. He is now holds a Distinguished Project Professor at the same institution.

== Publications ==
Hirokawa published numerous papers include the following

- Hirokawa, N. Cross-linker system between neurofilaments, microtubules, and membranous organelles in frog axons revealed by the quick-freeze, deep-etching method. Journal of Cell Biology 94(1): 129-142, 1982.
- Hirokawa, N., K.K. Pfister, H. Yorifuji, M.C. Wagner, S.T. Brady, and G.S. Bloom. Submolecular domains of bovine brain kinesin identified by electron microscopy and monoclonal antibody decoration. Cell 56(5): 867-878, 1989
- Okada, Y., H. Yamazaki, Y. Sekine-Aizawa, and N. Hirokawa. The neuron-specific kinesin superfamily protein KIF1A is a unique monomeric motor for anterograde axonal transport of synaptic vesicle precursors. Cell 81(5): 769-780, 1995.
- Hirokawa, N. Kinesin and dynein superfamily proteins and the mechanism of organelle transport. Science 279(5350): 519-526, 1998.
- Nonaka, S., Y. Tanaka, Y. Okada, S. Takeda, A. Harada, Y. Kanai, M. Kido, and N. Hirokawa. Randomization of left-right asymmetry due to loss of nodal cilia generating leftward flow of extraembryonic fluid in mice lacking KIF3B motor protein. Cell 95(6): 829-837, 1998.
- Okada, Y., and N. Hirokawa. A Processive Single-Headed Motor: Kinesin Superfamily Protein KIF1A. Science 283: 1152–1157, 1999.
- Setou, M., T. Nakagawa, D.H. Seog, and N. Hirokawa. Kinesin superfamily motor protein KIF17 and mLin-10 in NMDA receptor-containing vesicle transport. Science 288(5472): 1796–1802, 2000.
- Kikkawa, M., E.P. Sablin, Y. Okada, H. Yajima, R.J. Fletterick, and N. Hirokawa. Switch-based mechanism of kinesin motors. Nature 411(6836): 439-445, 2001.
- Homma, N., Y. Takei, Y. Tanaka, T. Nakata, S. Terada, M. Kikkawa, Y. Noda, and N. Hirokawa. Kinesin superfamily protein 2A (KIF2A) functions in suppression of collateral branch extension. Cell 114: 229-239, 2003.
- Nitta, R., M. Kikkawa, Y. Okada, and N. Hirokawa. KIF1A alternately uses two loops to bind microtubules. Science 305: 678-683, 2004.
- Hirokawa, N. and R. Takemura. Molecular motors and mechanisms of directional transport in neurons. Nature Reviews Neuroscience 6: 201-214, 2005.
- Hirokawa, N., Y. Tanaka, Y. Okada and S. Takeda. Nodal flow and the generation of left-right asymmetry. (Review Article) Cell 125(1): 33-45, 2006.
- Midorikawa, R., Y. Takei, and N. Hirokawa. KIF4 motor regulates activity-dependent neuronal survival by suppressing PARP-1 enzymatic activity. Cell 125: 371-383, 2006

== Honors and awards ==
Hirokawa received several honors and awards include the following

- Asahi Prize, Asahi Shimbun (1995)
- Japan Academy Prize, Japan Academy (1999)
- Foreign member, European Molecular Biology Organization (2003)
- Member, Japan Academy (2004)
- Person of Cultural Merit (2013)
- Eduard Buchner Prize, Germany (2005)
- Order of Culture (2024)
