= Hajime Nakamura =

Japanese philosopher (1912–1999)

- 中村 元
- Born: November 28, 1912; Shimane, Matsue; Japan
- Died: October 10, 1999 (aged 86)
- Other name: 中村 元
- Occupations: Academic of Vedic, Hindu and Buddhist scriptures

Hajime Nakamura (中村 元, Nakamura Hajime; November 28, 1912 – October 10, 1999) was a Japanese Orientalist, Indologist, philosopher and academic of Vedic, Hindu and Buddhist scriptures.

== Biography ==
Nakamura was born in Matsue, Shimane Prefecture, Japan. In 1943 he graduated from the Department of Literature at Tokyo Imperial University on a study on "The History of Early Vedanta Philosophy" under the supervision of Prof. Hakuju Ui. In 1943 he succeeded Prof. Ui and was appointed Associate Professor of Tokyo Imperial University.

He was a professor there from 1954 to 1973. After retiring from Tokyo University, he established Toho Gakuin (The Eastern Institute, Inc.) and lectured on philosophy to the general public.

== Academic studies ==
Nakamura was an expert on Sanskrit and Pali, and among his many writings are commentaries on Buddhist scriptures. He is most known in Japan as the first to translate the entire Pali Tripitaka into Japanese. This work is still considered the definitive translation to date against which later translations are measured. The footnotes in his Pali translation often refer to other previous translations in German, English, French as well as the ancient Chinese translations of Sanskrit scriptures.

Because of his meticulous approach to translation he had a dominating and lasting influence in the study of Indic philosophy in Japan at a time when it was establishing itself throughout the major Japanese universities. He also indirectly influenced the secular scholastic study of Buddhism throughout Eastern and Southern Asia, especially Taiwan and Korea. Japan, Korea, Taiwan and recently China is the only area in which all major scriptural languages of Buddhism (Chinese, Tibetan, Sanskrit and Pali) are taught and studied by academics of Indic philosophy.

Nakamura was influenced by the Indian philosophy of Buddhism, Chinese, Japanese and Western thought. He made remarks on the problem of bioethics.

Nakamura published more than 170 monographs, both in Japanese and in Western languages, and over a thousand articles.

== Awards ==
- An Imperial Award of the Japan Academy for "The History of Early Vedanta Philosophy", a slightly revised version of his doctoral thesis
- The Order of Culture in 1977 (Japan)
- A nomination to the Japan Academy in 1982.
- Honorary degree of Vidya-Vacaspati by President of India Dr Sarvepalli Radhakrishnan.

== Publications ==
- Nakamura, Hajime (1960), The Ways of Thinking of Eastern Peoples, Japanese National Commission for UNESCO
- Nakamura, Hajime (1964), Ways of Thinking of Eastern Peoples: India, China, Tibet, Japan, University of Hawaii Press
- Nakamura, Hajime (1989), A History of Early Vedanta Philosophy. Part One, Delhi: Motilal Banarsidass Publishers Private Limited
- Nakamura, Hajime (2004), A History of Early Vedanta Philosophy. Part Two, Delhi: Motilal Banarsidass Publishers Private Limited
- Nakamura, Hajime (1980), Indian Buddhism: A Survey With Bibliographical Notes, Delhi: Motilal Banarsidass Publishers Private Limited
- Nakamura, Hajime (1992), A Comparative History Of Ideas, Delhi: Motilal Banarsidass Publishers Private Limited
- Nakamura, Hajime (2000), Gotama Buddha: a biography based on the most reliable texts, Kosei

== Sources ==
- Sengaku Mayeda (2000), Remembering Dr. Hajime Nakamura. In: Philosophy East and West, Vol. 50, Number 3. (July 2000). University of Hawaii Press. P.Y. pp.IV-VIII, archived from the original on 2014-06-16
- Takasaki, Jikido (2000), In memoriam Prof. Hajime Nakamura. In: Journal of the International Association of Buddhist Studies, Volume 23, Number 1, 2000
- Корнеев М. Я. Хадзимэ Накамура как мыслитель-компаративист: первые подходы к анализу его творчества // Компаративистика- II: Альманах сравнительных социогуманитарных исследований. СПб., 2002. С. 84–87.
