= Prasanta Pattanaik =

Indian economist (born 1943)

Prasanta Kumar Pattanaik
- Born: 5 April 1943 (age 83)

Academic background
- Education: Utkal University; Delhi School of Economics; University of Delhi
- Influences: Amartya Sen

Academic work
- Discipline: Social choice theory and microeconomic theory
- Institutions: University of California
- Awards: Padma Shri

Prasanta Kumar Pattanaik (born 5 April 1943), is an Indian-American emeritus professor at the Department of Economics at the University of California. He is a Fellow of the Econometric Society.

Along with Amartya Sen and Kenneth Arrow, Pattanaik is an advisory editor for the journal Social Choice and Welfare.

He is a recipient of the Padma Shri award of 2020 by the Government of India in Literature and Education.

== Education ==
Pattanaik gained his degree in economics from Utkal University, Odisha, India. He then went on to study for his master's degree and doctorate, both in economics, at the Delhi School of Economics University of Delhi.

Pattanaik studied under, the Nobel Prize winning economist, Amartya Sen and his "leadership role" in the study of social choice theory has been acknowledged by Sen.

== Selected bibliography ==
=== Book series ===
Pattanaik is one of the series editors for the Springer series Studies in Choice and Welfare, which included being co-editor of Rational choice and social welfare theory and applications: essays in honor of Kotaro Suzumura.

=== Books ===
- Pattanaik, Prasanta K. (1971). Voting and collective choice: some aspects of the theory of group decision-making. Cambridge: Cambridge University Press. ISBN 9780521079617. OCLC 874575799.
- Pattanaik, Prasanta (1978). Strategy and group choice. Amsterdam & New York: North-Holland Publishing Co. ISBN 9780444851260.
- Pattanaik, Prasanta K.; Salles, Maurice (1983). Social choice and welfare: contributions to economic analysis. Amsterdam & New York: North-Holland Publishing Co. ISBN 9780444864871. Papers presented at the symposium on collective choice, which was held in Caen, from 4 September to 9 September 1980.
- Pattanaik, Prasanta K.; Gaertner, Wulf (1988). Distributive justice and inequality: a selection of papers given at a conference, Berlin, May 1986. Berlin & New York: Springer-Verlag. ISBN 9783540194217.
- Pattanaik, Prasanta K.; Basu, Kaushik; Suzumura, Kotaro (1995). Choice, welfare, and development: a festschrift in honour of Amartya K. Sen. Oxford & New York: Clarendon Press Oxford University Press. ISBN 9780198287896.
- Pattanaik, Prasanta K.; Cullenberg, Stephen (2004). Globalization, culture, and the limits of the market: essays in economics and philosophy. Themes in Economics. New Delhi & New York: Oxford University Press. ISBN 9780195664461.
- Pattanaik, Prasanta K.; Tadenuma, Koichi; Xu, Yongsheng; Yoshihara, Naoki (2008). Rational choice and social welfare theory and applications: essays in honor of Kotaro Suzumura. Studies in Choice and Welfare. Berlin: Springer. ISBN 9783540798316.
- Pattanaik, Prasanta (2009). Essays on individual decision-making and social welfare. New Delhi & New York: Oxford University Press. ISBN 9780195695960.
- Pattanaik, Prasanta K.; Anand, Paul; Puppe, Clemens (2009). The handbook of rational and social choice: an overview of new foundations and applications. Oxford & New York: Oxford University Press. ISBN 9780199290420.

=== Chapters in books ===
- Pattanaik, Prasanta K. (2002), "Positional rules of collective decision-making", in Sen, Amartya; Suzumura, Kōtarō; Arrow, Kenneth J. (eds.), Handbook of social choice and welfare, Amsterdam & Boston: Elsevier, pp. 361–394, ISBN 9780444829146.

Also available as: a journal article.

- Pattanaik, Prasanta K. (2008), "social welfare function (definition)", in Durlauf, Steven N.; Blume, Lawrence E. (eds.), The new Palgrave dictionary of economics (2nd ed.), Basingstoke, Hampshire & New York: Palgrave Macmillan, ISBN 9780333786765.

Also available as: a journal article.

- Pattanaik, Prasanta K.; Dhongde, Shatakshee (2009), "Preference, choice, and rationality: Amartya Sen's critique of the theory of rational choice in economics", in Morris, Christopher (ed.), Amartya Sen, Cambridge & New York: Cambridge University Press, pp. 13–39, ISBN 9780521618069.
- Pattanaik, Prasanta K. (2009), "Rights, individual preferences and collective rationality", in Kanbur, Ravi; Basu, Kaushik (eds.), Arguments for a better world: essays in honor of Amartya Sen, vol. I: Ethics, welfare, and measurement, Oxford & New York: Oxford University Press, pp. 213–230, ISBN 9780199239115

=== Journal articles ===
1965–1969

- Pattanaik, Prasanta K. (December 1967). "A note on Leibenstein's 'Notes on welfare economics and the theory of democracy'". The Economic Journal. 77 (308): 953–956. doi:10.2307/2229616. JSTOR 2229616.
- Pattanaik, Prasanta K. (January 1968). "A note on democratic decision and the existence of choice sets". The Review of Economic Studies. 35 (1): 1–9. doi:10.2307/2974402. JSTOR 2974402.
- Pattanaik, Prasanta K. (November–December 1968). "Risk, impersonality, and the social welfare function". Journal of Political Economy. 76 (6): 1152–1169. doi:10.1086/259479. JSTOR 1830155. S2CID 154782047.
- Pattanaik, Prasanta K.; Sen, Amartya (August 1969). "Necessary and sufficient conditions for rational choice under majority decision". Journal of Economic Theory. 1 (2): 178–202. doi:10.1016/0022-0531(69)90020-9.

1970–1974

- Pattanaik, Prasanta K. (January 1970). "Sufficient conditions for the existence of a choice set under majority voting". Econometrica. 38 (1): 165–170. doi:10.2307/1909248. JSTOR 1909248.
- Pattanaik, Prasanta K. (September 1970). "Domestic distortions and the gains from trade". The Economic Journal. 80 (319): 638–649. doi:10.2307/2229957. JSTOR 2229957.
- Pattanaik, Prasanta K.; Batra, Raveendra N. (October 1972). "On some suggestions for having non-binary social choice functions". Theory and Decision. 3 (1): 1–11. doi:10.1007/BF00139349. S2CID 121130018.
- Pattanaik, Prasanta K. (December 1973). "On the stability of sincere voting situations". Journal of Economic Theory. 6 (6): 558–574. doi:10.1016/0022-0531(73)90076-8.

1975–1979

- Pattanaik, Prasanta K. (January 1975). "Strategic voting without collusion under binary and democratic group decision rules". The Review of Economic Studies. 42 (1): 93–103. doi:10.2307/2296823. JSTOR 2296823.
- Pattanaik, Prasanta K. (February 1976). "Counter-threats and strategic manipulation under voting schemes". The Review of Economic Studies. 43 (1): 11–18. doi:10.2307/2296596. JSTOR 2296596.
- Pattanaik, Prasanta K.; Dutta, Bhaskar (January 1978). "On nicely consistent voting systems". Econometrica. 46 (1): 163–170. doi:10.2307/1913653. JSTOR 1913653.

1980–1984

- Pattanaik, Prasanta K.; Sengupta, Manimay (January 1982). "Outcomes of admissible Nash equilibria and sophisticated voting when decisions are based on pairwise comparisons". Mathematical Social Sciences. 2 (1): 39–54. doi:10.1016/0165-4896(82)90043-9.
- Pattanaik, Prasanta K.; Peleg, Bezalel (August 1984). "An axiomatic characterization of the lexicographic maximin extension of an ordering over a set to the power set". Social Choice and Welfare. 1 (2): 113–122. doi:10.1007/BF00452883. S2CID 121720013.

1985–1989

- Pattanaik, Prasanta K.; Barrett, C.R.; Salles, Maurice (May 1986). "On the structure of fuzzy social welfare functions". Fuzzy Sets and Systems. 19 (1): 1–10. doi:10.1016/S0165-0114(86)80072-0.
- Pattanaik, Prasanta K.; Barrett, C.R. (September 1987). "Aggregation of probability judgments". Econometrica. 55 (5): 1237–1241. doi:10.2307/1911272. JSTOR 1911272.
- Pattanaik, Prasanta K.; Gaertner, Wulf (March 1988). "An interview with Amartya Sen". Social Choice and Welfare. 5 (1): 69–79. doi:10.1007/BF00435498. S2CID 153883889.
- Pattanaik, Prasanta K. (November 1988). "On the consistency of libertarian values". Economica. 55 (220): 517–524. doi:10.2307/2553913. JSTOR 2553913.
- Pattanaik, Prasanta K.; Barrett, C.R. (1989). "Bargaining over employment and wages, with threats of strikes and lockouts: An extension of the Nash solution". European Journal of Political Economy. 5 (2–3): 333–345. doi:10.1016/0176-2680(89)90053-0.
- Pattanaik, Prasanta K.; Barrett, C. Richard (October 1989). "Fuzzy sets, preference and choice: some conceptual issues". Bulletin of Economic Research. 41 (4): 229–254. doi:10.1111/j.1467-8586.1989.tb00341.x.

1990–1994

- Pattanaik, Prasanta K.; Xu, Yongsheng (1990). "On ranking opportunity sets in terms of freedom of choice". Recherches Économiques de Louvain / Louvain Economic Review. 56 (3–4). Department of Economics, Universite Catholique de Louvain: 383–390. doi:10.1017/S0770451800043955. JSTOR 40723933. S2CID 153418558.
- Pattanaik, Prasanta K.; Suzumura, Kōtarō; Gaertner, Wulf (May 1992). "Individual rights revisited". Economica. 59 (234): 161–177. doi:10.2307/2554744. JSTOR 2554744.
- Pattanaik, Prasanta K. (April 1994). "Rights and freedom in welfare economics". European Economic Review. 38 (3–4): 731–738. doi:10.1016/0014-2921(94)90108-2.

1995–1999

- Pattanaik, Prasanta K.; Sengupta, Manimay (March 1995). "An alternative axiomatization of Sen's poverty measure". The Review of Income and Wealth. 41 (1): 73–80. doi:10.1111/j.1475-4991.1995.tb00094.x.
- Pattanaik, Prasanta K.; Suzumura, Kōtarō (April 1996). "Individual rights and social evaluation: a conceptual framework". Oxford Economic Papers. 48 (2): 194–212. doi:10.1093/oxfordjournals.oep.a028565.
- Pattanaik, Prasanta K. (1997). "Fuzziness and the Normative Theory of Social Choice". Consensus Under Fuzziness. International Series in Intelligent Technologies. Vol. 10. Springer. pp. 17–27. doi:10.1007/978-1-4615-6333-4_2. ISBN 978-1-4613-7908-9.
- Pattanaik, Prasanta K.; Deb, Rajat; Razzolini, Laura (January 1997). "Game forms, rights, and the efficiency of social outcomes". Journal of Economic Theory. 72 (1): 74–95. doi:10.1006/jeth.1996.2201.
- Pattanaik, Prasanta K.; Xu, Yongsheng (April 1998). "On preference and freedom". Theory and Decision. 44 (2): 173–198. doi:10.1023/A:1004924211553. S2CID 117801220.

2000–2004

- Pattanaik, Prasanta K.; Xu, Yongsheng (September 2000). "On diversity and freedom of choice". Mathematical Social Sciences. 40 (2): 123–130. doi:10.1016/S0165-4896(99)00043-8.
- Pattanaik, Prasanta K.; Dutta, Indranil; Xu, Yongsheng (May 2003). "On measuring deprivation and the standard of living in a multidimensional framework on the basis of aggregate data". Economica. 70 (278): 197–221. doi:10.1111/1468-0335.t01-1-00279. S2CID 18619347.

2005–2009

- Pattanaik, Prasanta K. (December 2005). "Little and Bergson on Arrow's concept of social welfare". Social Choice and Welfare. 25 (2–3): 369–379. doi:10.1007/s00355-005-0009-7. S2CID 1451237.
- Pattanaik, Prasanta K.; Xu, Yongsheng (April 2007). "Minimal relativism, dominance, and standard of living comparisons based on functionings". Oxford Economic Papers. 59 (2): 354–374. doi:10.1093/oep/gpl030. S2CID 36357167.
- Pattanaik, Prasanta K.; Chakraborty, Achin; Xu, Yongsheng (January 2008). "On the mean of squared deprivation gaps". Economic Theory. 34 (1): 181–187. doi:10.1007/s00199-006-0128-0. S2CID 62881711.

2010–2014

- Pattanaik, Prasanta K.; Dasgupta, Indraneel (August 2010). "Revealed preference with stochastic demand correspondence". The B.E. Journal of Theoretical Economics. 10 (1). doi:10.2202/1935-1704.1654. ISSN 1935-1704. S2CID 53574356.
- Pattanaik, Prasanta K.; Bhattacharyya, Aditi; Xu, Yongsheng (July 2011). "Choice, internal consistency and rationality". Economics and Philosophy. 27 (2): 123–149. doi:10.1017/S0266267111000034. S2CID 644747.
- Pattanaik, Prasanta K.; Xu, Yongsheng; Reddy, Sanjay G. (January 2012). "On measuring deprivation and living standards of societies in a multi-attribute framework". Oxford Economic Papers. 64 (1): 43–56. doi:10.1093/oep/gpr034.
- Pattanaik, Prasanta K.; Xu, Yongsheng (July 2012). "On dominance and context-dependence in decisions involving multiple attributes". Economics and Philosophy. 28 (2): 117–132. doi:10.1017/S0266267112000132. S2CID 13242197.
- Pattanaik, Prasanta K. (2013). "The concepts of choice and preference in economics". Journal of Economic Methodology. 20 (2): 215–218. doi:10.1080/1350178X.2013.804680. S2CID 154367803.
- Pattanaik, Prasanta K.; Xu, Yongsheng (July 2014). "The ethical bases of public policies: a conceptual framework". Economics and Philosophy. 30 (2): 175–194. doi:10.1017/S0266267114000157. S2CID 232148053.

=== Discussion papers ===
- Pattanaik, Prasanta K.; Sengupta, Manimay (1988). Poverty measurement: a generalization of Sen's result. Christchurch, New Zealand: Department of Economics, University of Canterbury. OCLC 153036842. Discussion paper number 8807.
- Pattanaik, Prasanta K.; Sengupta, Manimay (1991). On an index of poverty. Christchurch, New Zealand: Department of Economics, University of Canterbury. OCLC 154042194. Discussion paper number 9105.
- Pattanaik, Prasanta K. (1997). Cultural indicators of well-being: some conceptual issues. Geneeva and Paris: United Nations Research Institute for Social Development (UNRISD), UNESCO. OCLC 38002114. Occasional paper series on culture and development, 2.
- Pattanaik, Prasanta K.; Dasgupta, Indraneel; Kumar, Subodh (1999). On falsifiability of the maximization hypothesis. Burwood, Melbourne, Victoria, Australia: School of Economics, Deakin University. ISBN 9780730027737. Working paper series 9903.
- Pattanaik, Prasanta K.; Barberà, Salvador; Bossert, Walter (2001). Ranking sets of objects. Montréal, Canada: Université de Montréal, Département de sciences économiques. OCLC 47035661.
- Pattanaik, Prasanta K.; Xu, Yongsheng; Bossert, Walter (2001). The measurement of diversity. Montréal, Canada: Université de Montréal, Département de sciences économiques. OCLC 48754480.
- Pattanaik, Prasanta K.; Dutta, Indranil; Gundersen, Craig (2006). Measures of food insecurity at the household level. Helsinki, Finland: United Nations University - World Institute for Development Economics Research (UNU-WIDER). OCLC 315670257.
- Pattanaik, Prasanta K.; Dasgupta, Indraneel (2010). Comparative statics for a consumer with possibly multiple optimum consumption bundles. Bonn, Germany: Bonn Forschungsinstitut zur Zukunft der Arbeit GmbH, Institute for the Study of Labor (Institut zur Zukunft der Arbeit, IZA). OCLC 643195342. IZA discussion paper number 4818.
