= Tamio Yamakawa =

Japanese biochemist

- 山川 民夫; やまかわ たみお
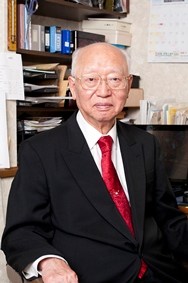
- Born: 12 October 1921; Sendai, Miyagi Prefecture
- Died: 7 October 2018 (aged 96)
- Education: University of Tokyo
- Known for: Glycolipids
- Awards: Asahi Prize (1974); Japan Academy Prize (1976); Person of Cultural Merit (2014)
- Scientific career
- Fields: Biochemistry
- Workplaces: University of Tokyo

Tamio Yamakawa (Japanese: 山川 民夫; やまかわ たみお; 12 October 1921 - 7 October 2018) was a Japanese biochemist, the first to report the presence of glycosphingolipids on cell membranes. Yamakawa graduated from the University of Tokyo, was an emeritus professor at Tokyo University of Pharmacy and Life Sciences, and a member of the Japanese Academy of Sciences. The molecule was found on horse red blood cells and first called Hematoside. Further testing by Yamakawa led to the discovery that ABO blood group antigens are glycosphingolipids located in the erythrocytes.

Yamakawa was born in Sendai, Miyagi Prefecture to Shintaro Yamakawa and Kunio Yamakawa. In 1944 he Graduated from Tokyo Imperial University Medical School, and received a doctorate at the University of Tokyo. In 1952 he was a Professor of the Institute of Infectious Diseases at The University of Tokyo, later Professor of Medicine and Director of Tokyo Metropolitan Organization Medical Research Institute. He was Professor Emeritus of Tokyo Pharmaceutical University. From 2002 to 2011 he was the Chairman of the Institute for Microbiological Chemistry.

== Awards and honors ==
Yamakawa received the Asahi Prize in 1974, the Japan Academy Prize in 1976, was admitted to the Japan Academy in 1987 and was designated as a Person of Cultural Merit (文化功労者 bunka kōrōsha) in 2014.

== Tributes ==
In 2016, the Japan Consortium for Glycobiology and Glycotechnology established an international award in Yamakawa honor that is given each year to a researcher who made outstanding contributions to the field of glycoscience.
