= Hiroko Takenishi =

Japanese writer

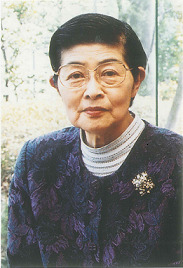

Hiroko Takenishi (竹西 寛子, Takenishi Hiroko; born 11 April 1929, Hiroshima) is a Japanese fiction writer and literary critic. Takenishi is best known for her semi-autobiographical short story "The Rite" (1963), which tells of her experience surviving the Atomic Bombing of Hiroshima. In 2012 she was named a Person of Cultural Merit for her writing.
