= Pat Ruggles =

American economist

- Born: United States

Academic background
- Education: Yale University

Academic work
- Discipline: Poverty
- Institutions: United States Department of Health and Human Services

Patricia Ruggles is an economist and social statistician who studies poverty. Formerly the chief economist at the United States Department of Health and Human Services, she is now a Senior Fellow at the National Opinion Research Center at the University of Chicago.

Ruggles is the daughter of Yale University economists Richard Ruggles and Nancy D. Ruggles, and the granddaughter of Harvard University economist Clyde O. Ruggles. She earned a bachelor's degree from Yale, and a master's degree and PhD from Harvard, all in economics. She worked for the United States Congress Joint Economic Committee from 1990 to 1996, when she moved to the Department of Health and Human Services, and again from 2000 to 2003, when she retired. She joined the National Opinion Research Center in 2013.

She is a fellow of the American Statistical Association.
