= Masaaki Sugiyama =

Japanese historian

- Born: March 1, 1952; Shizuoka Prefecture, Japan
- Died: December 24, 2019 (aged 67)
- Education: Kyoto University (1974)
- Awards: Japan Academy Prize (2007)

Masaaki Sugiyama (杉山正明, Sugiyama Masaaki) (1952-2019) was a Japanese historian and author.

Sugiyama was born March 1, 1952, in Shizuoka Prefecture, Japan. He graduated from the Faculty of Letters of Kyoto University in 1974.

In 1992, he became an associate professor at the Faculty of Letters at Kyoto University, and in 1995, a professor, and later a professor at the Graduate School of Letters. He received the Japan Academy Prize in 2007.

Sugiyama died on December 24, 2019.

== See also ==
- Catherine Verfaillie
- List of Japanese Nobel laureates
- List of Nobel laureates affiliated with Kyoto University
- Tasuku Honjo
