= Uwe Reinhardt =

German economist (1937–2017)

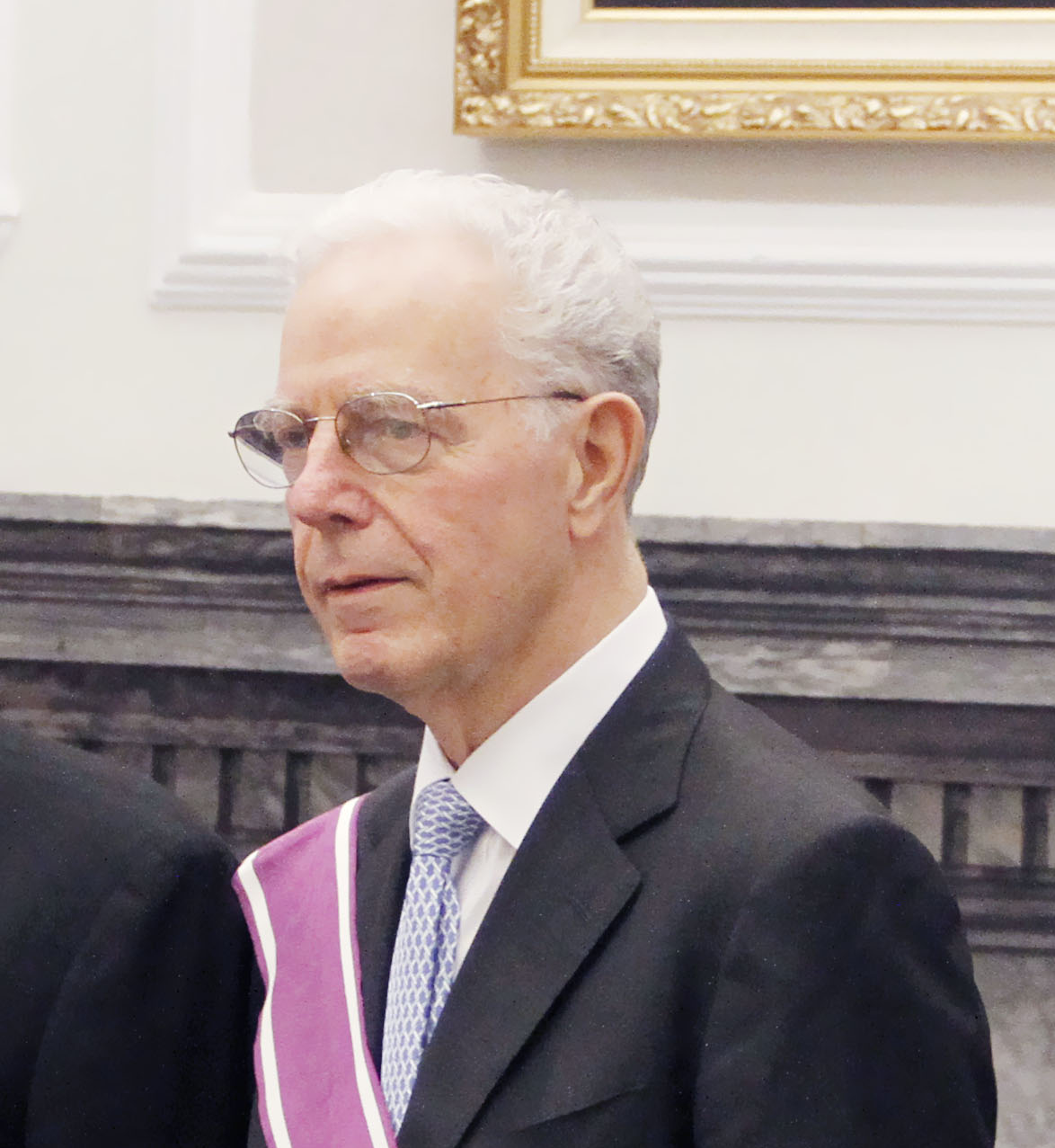
- Born: September 24, 1937; Osnabrück, Germany
- Died: November 14, 2017 (aged 80)
- Scientific career
- Doctoral advisor: Richard Ruggles

Uwe Ernst Reinhardt (September 24, 1937 – November 14, 2017) was a German health economist who served as the James Madison Professor of Political Economy and Professor of Economics at Princeton University and held various advisory roles in both the public and private sectors, the latter included several positions in the healthcare industry. Reinhardt was a prominent scholar in health care economics and a listened-to voice on health care and health policy in government including the United States Congress where he often testified in both the House and Senate, as well as the private sector where he was a sought-after speaker and author on subjects ranging from the war in Iraq to the future of health care in America.

== Biography ==
Reinhardt was born 1937 in Osnabrück, Germany, and later emigrated to Canada, where he received his Bachelor of Commerce degree from University of Saskatchewan. He was awarded the Canadian Governor General's Gold Medal for being the most distinguished graduate of the year. He later received a Ph.D. in economics from Yale University in 1970, with a thesis titled "An Economic Analysis of Physicians' Practices" under the supervision of Richard Ruggles. The thesis was later published as a book titled Physician Productivity and the Demand for Manpower (Ballinger 1975). At Princeton University he taught courses in economic theory and policy, corporate finance, accounting, financial management of public enterprises, and health economics and policy. Reinhardt's scholarly work focused on economics and policy and included more far-reaching topics such as cost–benefit analyses of the Lockheed L-1011 TriStar. In 1972, he also gave presentations on Mathematica's economic analysis of the Space Shuttle system. Reinhardt was married to Tsung-Mei Cheng, also known as May Reinhardt.

In July 2015, Reinhardt's Princeton 2013 micro-economic course syllabus and first lecture for a class titled "Introductory Korean Drama" received attention from several bloggers and caused a spate of Korean media inquiries to him in Princeton. By way of explanation, Reinhardt introduced the class by stating:

After the near‐collapse of the world's financial system has shown that we economists really do not know how the world works, I am much too embarrassed to teach economics anymore, which I have done for many years. I will teach Modern Korean Drama instead. Although I have never been to Korea, I have watched Korean drama on a daily basis for over six years now. Therefore I can justly consider myself an expert in that subject.

It was not clear whether Reinhardt actually intended to teach the course.

== Research ==
Reinhardt's research focused on hospital pricing, systems of health care around the world, Medicare reform, and health care spending. His work appeared in Health Affairs, The New England Journal of Medicine, JAMA, The British Medical Journal, and The European Heart Journal. His final published work was the book titled Priced Out: The Economic and Ethical Costs of American Health Care (Princeton University Press 2019).

In one paper, Reinhardt discusses the obstacles to success of consumer-directed health care in light of the lack of transparency in hospital pricing. He suggests several reforms that could lead to better information on hospital pricing for consumer decision-making, including a national set of diagnosis-related group weights to which each hospital could then apply its own conversion factor. Reinhardt's previous work on hospitals examined the tax and cost of equity capital advantages of not-for-profit hospitals over for-profit hospitals.

Reinhardt's scholarship analyzed the U.S. health care industry in relation to systems around the world. He argued that higher U.S. health spending is a result of higher U.S. per capita gross domestic product (GDP) as well as intricate and disjointed payment systems. Reinhardt's work on foreign systems of health care includes a 2004 analysis of Switzerland that appeared in JAMA. In it, Reinhardt argued that there is little correlation between the prevalence of consumer choice and the high quality of Swiss health care.

In 2003, Reinhardt and 14 other experts on health policy and the private health care industry signed an open letter arguing that Medicare should lead the U.S. health care industry in paying for performance by tying financial reimbursement to quality measures.

Reinhardt's work on health care spending includes his argument that the aging of the U.S. population is not the primary cause of the growth in U.S. health care spending.

== Private industry and advisory roles ==
In addition to his university duties, Reinhardt was active as an advisor for government, non-profit organizations, and private industry and held directorships in various for-profit companies in the health industry. Reinhardt was a member of the National Academy of Medicine of the National Academies of Sciences (NAM, formerly the Institute of Medicine), and served on its Governing Council between 1979 and 1982, after election to the Institute in 1978. At the institute, he served on a number of study panels, including the Committee on the Implications of For-Profit Medicine, the Committee on Technical Innovation in Medicine, the Committee on the Implications of a Physicians Surplus, and the Committee on the U.S. Physician Supply. In 1996, he was appointed to the Board of Health Care services of the institute.

From 1986 to 1995, Reinhardt served three consecutive three-year terms as a Commissioner on the Physician Payment Review Commission (PPRC), established in 1986 by the Congress to advise it on issues related to the payment of physicians. Reinhardt served as a Commissioner for the Kaiser Family Foundation Commission on Medicaid and the Uninsured. Reinhardt was a member of numerous editorial boards, among them The New England Journal of Medicine, JAMA, The Journal of Health Economics, Health Affairs, and the Milbank Quarterly.

Reinhardt served as a trustee of Duke University and the Tekla Family of Funds. He also served on the Boards of Directors of Boston Scientific Corporation, a leading maker of medical devices, and Amerigroup Corporation, a large health insurer whose clients consist primarily of persons enrolled in Medicare. He served on the Board of Directors of Triad Hospitals, Inc, until that company was merged into Community Health Systems in 2007. He was a regular contributor to the New York Times' Economix blog, where he wrote about economic matters, particularly the economics of health care.

=== Role in Taiwan's healthcare system, science and technology research and development, and awards ===
In 1989, as Taiwan was restructuring its healthcare system, Reinhardt, then serving as a high-level advisor to Taiwan's government, persuaded its leaders to established a universal single-payer health system, taking lessons from the single-payer health systems of Canada, the National Health Service (NHS) of the United Kingdom, Medicare and Veterans Health Administration (VHA) of the United States, and the single-payer health systems of Nordic countries. As of 2025, Taiwan's single-payer health system provides universal care with 7.6% of GDP, covering 100% of Taiwan's population of 23.4 million plus foreign residents with generous benefits. For his contribution, in 2015 he was awarded the nation's Presidential Prize The Order of Brilliant Star with Violet Grand Cordon. In 2018, Reinhardt was posthumously awarded the First Grade Medal for Professionalism in Health and Welfare by Taiwan's Ministry of Health and Welfare.

Reinhardt was also a long time advisor of the Science and Technology Advisory Board (STAG) of the Office of the Premier of Taiwan and advised Taiwan's premier on a wide-ranging set of issues relating to science and technology in Taiwan.

== Views ==
=== Administration ===
In the 2009 Frontline show "Sick Around America", Reinhardt criticized the United States for spending 24% of every health care dollar on administration, and pointed out that Canada spends less than half of the U.S. amount and Taiwan spends significantly less than Canada. Reinhardt faulted the seeming U.S. preference for an unwieldy "mishmash of private insurance plans" for the inefficiency. He said if the U.S. could spend half as much on administration, it would save more than enough money to cover all the uninsured.

== Selected articles ==
- "Little hope for the uninsured." Denver Post, January 25, 2004; E4.
