= Shirōta Kusakabe =

Japanese geophysicist

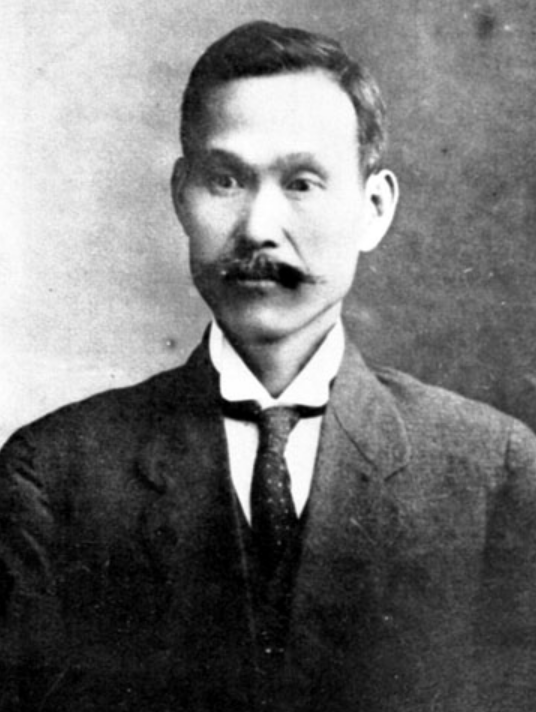

Shirōta Kusakabe (Japanese: 日下部 四郎太, May 5 1875 – July 3 1924) was a Japanese geophysicist, doctor of Science. He was a professor at Tohoku Imperial University. He won the Imperial Academy Prize for his work on rock elasticity. He has published numerous treatises, and a magazine published after the Great Kanto Earthquake of 1923 contains a treatise on earthquake prediction by Shirota Kusakabe.

Shirōta Kusakabe was born in Yamagata Prefecture in 1875. In 1900, he graduated from the Department of Physics, Tokyo Imperial University. From August 1907 to December 1910, he studied abroad in Europe and visited Germany, France and the United Kingdom. He studied under Hantaro Nagaoka and proceeded with research on rocks and seismic waves. In 1914, he won the Imperial Academy Prize for his work on rock elasticity.
