= Richard Ruggles =

American economist (1916–2001)

Richard F. Ruggles
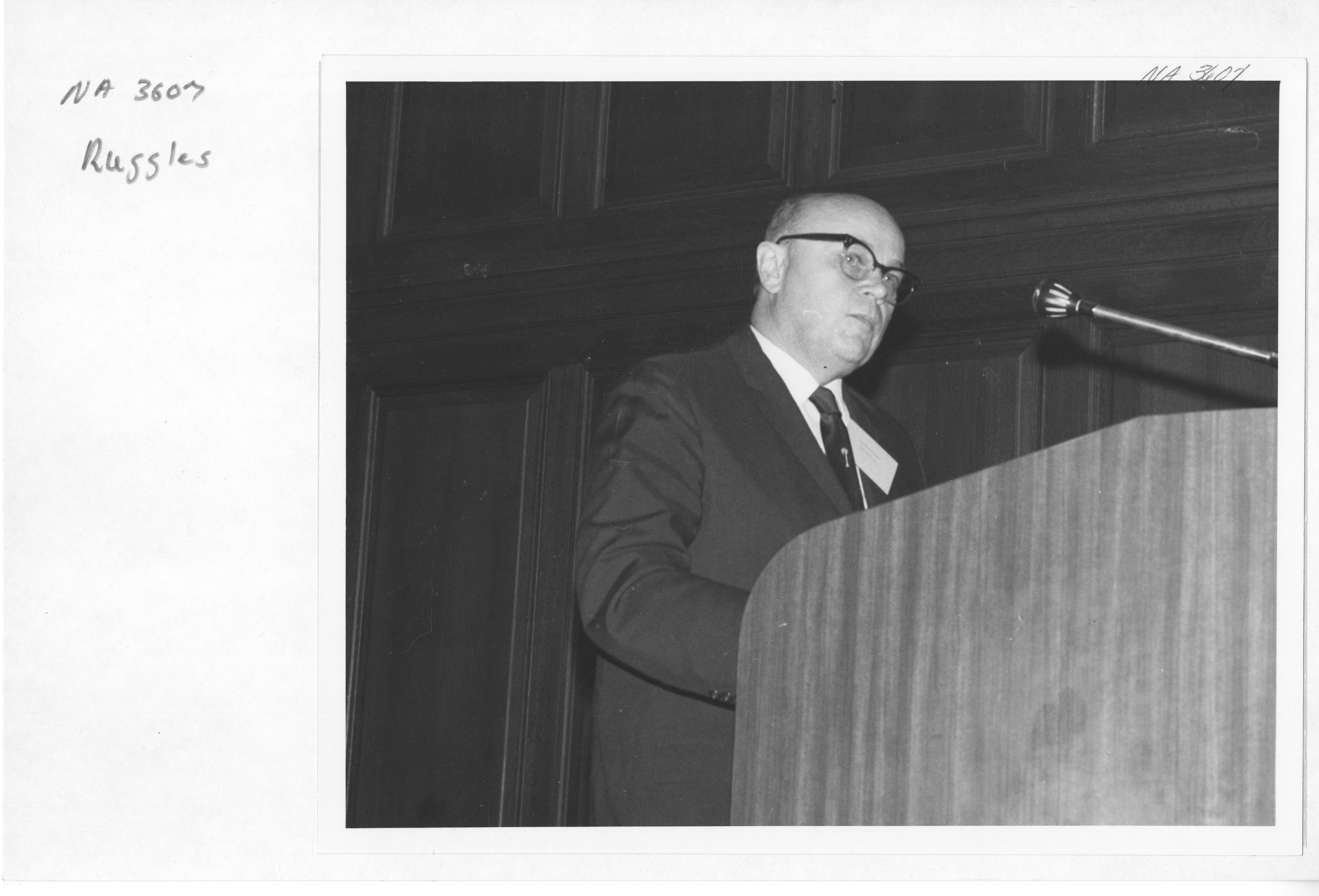
- Born: June 15, 1916; Columbus, Ohio
- Died: March 4, 2001 (aged 84)

Academic background
- Education: Harvard University

Academic work
- Institutions: Yale University
- Doctoral students: Uwe Reinhardt; Donald Shoup

Richard Francis Ruggles (1916– March 4, 2001) was an American economist known for "developing accounting tools for measuring national income and improving price indexes used in formulating government policy."

== Early life and education ==
Ruggles was born June 15, 1916, in Columbus, Ohio. He spent most of his youth in Cambridge, Massachusetts, where his father, Clyde O. Ruggles, also an economist, served as the dean of Harvard Business School. Ruggles later pursued both undergraduate and graduate economic studies at Harvard. In 1942, he was awarded a PhD for his thesis titled Price Structure and Distribution over the Cycle.

== World War II and academic career ==
In 1943, Ruggles traveled to London and joined the Office of Strategic Services, where he used photographs of destroyed German tank serial numbers to estimate production rates at different factories, solving the German tank problem.

Ruggles was a member of the economics department at Yale from 1946 to 1985, serving as chairman from 1969 to 1972. Additionally, he did research for government agencies, the United Nations, the Ford Foundation and the National Bureau of Economic Research.

In 1963 he was elected as a Fellow of the American Statistical Association.

== Family ==
Ruggles was married to Nancy D. Ruggles, also an economist, and they frequently worked together. Their daughter, Pat Ruggles, is also a noted economist. Their son, Steven Ruggles, is a professor of history, most known for his creation of IPUMS.

== The Nancy and Richard Ruggles Memorial Fund ==
The Nancy and Richard Ruggles Memorial Fund presents an annual award recognizing outstanding scholarship. The prize is given to a researcher or researchers aged 35 or under and it is administered by the trustees of the fund. The presentation is made at the General Conference of the International Association for Research in Income and Wealth (IARIW).

== Bibliography ==
- Nancy Ruggles; Richard Ruggles (1999). Macro- and Microdata Analyses and Their Integration. Edward Elgar. ISBN 978-1-85898-991-4.
- Nancy D. Ruggles; Richard Ruggles (1 January 1999). National Accounting and Economic Policy: The United States and UN Systems. Edward Elgar Publishing. ISBN 978-1-85898-992-1.
