= Tanabe Hisao Prize =

Tanabe Hisao Prize (Japanese: 田辺尚雄音楽賞 or 田辺尚雄賞) (often known more simply as the "Tanabe Prize") was created in 1983 by the Tōyō Ongaku Gakkai (Japanese: 東洋音楽学会, "Society for Research in Asiatic Music"), the oldest musicological society of Japan (headquartered in Tokyo). The prize is named after the musicologist Tanabe Hisao (Japanese: 田辺尚雄,1883–1984), one of the founding members of the society. The prize is awarded annually to one or several individuals or groups who have published an outstanding work of Asian musicology during the previous year, one that "promotes further research in Asian musicology and contributes to Japanese scholarship." It is generally considered the most prestigious award in the field of Asian musicology awarded in Japan.

== Winners ==
Past winners, titles, and publishers are as follows (Japanese ideographs following names, titles, and publishing companies repeat the transliteration they follow):

- 1983: Gamō Mitsuko 蒲生美津子, Sōga no ongakuteki kenkyū 『早歌の音楽的研究』[Musicological research on Sōga], Sanseidō 三省堂.
- 1984: Satō Michiko 佐藤道子, Ko-kannon no matsuri 「小観音のまつり」[The festival of Ko-kannon],” and “Hōyō no keishiki to naiyō” 「法要の形式と内容」[The forms and contents of Buddhist rituals],(articles).
- 1985: Kobayashi Mitsugu ed.. 小林責編, Kyōgen jiten shiryō-hen 『狂言辞典 資料編』[A dictionary of kyōgen, volume of materials], Tōkyōdō Shuppan 東京堂出版.
- 1986: Makino Eizō 牧野英三, Tōdaiji shunie shōmyō no senritsu ni kansuru kenkyū 『東大寺修二会声明の旋律に関する研究』[Research on the melodies of Buddhist chant at the Shunie of the Tōdaiji Temple], Yanagihara Shuppan 柳原出版.
- 1987: Hirano Kenji 平野健次, Shamisen to sō no kumiuta [Kumiuta accompanied by the shamisen or the koto]『三味線と箏の組歌』, Hakusuisha 白水社.
- 1988: no prize awarded
- 1989: Takeuchi Michitaka 竹内道敬, Kinsei hōgaku kenkyū nōto 『近世邦楽研究ノート』[Research notes on Japanese music during the Edo period], Meicho Kankōkai 名著刊行会.
- 1990: Tōyō ongaku gakkai, ed. 東洋音楽学会編, Nō no hayashi-goto 『能の囃子事』[The accompanimental music of Noh], Ongaku no Tomosha 音楽之友社.
- 1991: Inobe Kiyoshi 井野辺潔, Jōruri-shi kōsetsu 『浄瑠璃史考説』[A study of the history of jōruri], Kazama Shobō 風間書房.
  Tokumaru Yoshihiko 徳丸吉彦, Minzoku ongaku-gaku『民俗音楽学』[Ethnomusicology], Hōsō Daigaku Kyōiku Shinkōkai 放送大学教育振興会.
- 1992: Yasuda Bunkichi 安田文吉, Tokiwazu-bushi no kisoteki kenkyū 『常磐津節の基礎的研究』[Basic research on the Tokiwazu style of jōruri], Izumi Shoin 泉書院.
- 1993: Nihon Hōsō Kyōkai 日本放送協会編, ed. Nihon min’yō taikan: Amami shotō hen 『日本民謡大観 奄美諸島篇』[Grand Conspectus of Japanese folk songs: the Amami Islands], Nihon Hōsō Shuppan Kyōkai 日本放送出版協会.
  Tsukahara Yasuko 塚原康子, Jūkyū seiki no Nihon ni okeru seiyō ongaku no juyō 『十九世紀の日本における西洋音楽の受容』[The reception of western music in 19th century Japan], Taga Shuppan 多賀出版.
- 1994: Ogi Mitsuo 荻美津夫, Heian-chō ongaku seido-shi『平安朝音楽制度史』[The musical system of Heian period Japan], Yoshikawa Kōbunkan 吉川弘文館.
- 1995: Ōtsuka Haiko 大塚拝子, Shamisen ongaku no onkō riron 『三味線音楽の音高理論』[Pitch theory of shamisen music], Ongaku no Tomosha 音楽之友社.
  Gerald Groemer ジェラルド・グローマー, Bakumatsu no hayari-uta: kudoki-bushi to dodoitsu-bushi no shin kenkyū 『幕末のはやり唄――口説節と都々逸節の新研究』[Popular song in the late Edo period: new research on Kudoki and Dodoitsu], Meicho Shuppan 名著出版.
- 1996: Sakai Shōko 酒井正子, Amami utagake no diarōgu 『奄美歌掛けのディアローグ』[A dialogue of song in the Amami islands], Daiichi Shobō 第一書房.
- 1997: Yamada Yōichi 山田陽一, Songs of Spirits: An Ethnography of Sounds in a Papua New Guinea Society, Institute of Papua New Guinean Studies
- 1998: Arai Kōjun 新井弘順他 et al., Shingi Shingon shōmyō shūsei, gakufu-hen 『新義真言声明集成 楽譜編』[A collection of Buddhist chant of the Shingi Shingon sect: musical scores], Shingonshū Hōzan-ha Bukkyō Seinenkai 真言宗豊山派仏教青年会.
- 1999: Kishibe Shigeo 岸辺成雄, Edo jidai no koto-shi monogatari 『江戸時代の琴士物語』[Tales of koto players during the Edo period], Yūrindō 有隣堂.
- 2000: Tanimoto Kazuyuki 谷本一之, Ainu-e o kiku 『アイヌ絵を聴く』[Listening to pictures of Ainu], Hokkaidō Daigaku Tosho Kankōkai 北海道大学図書刊行会.
  Iso Mizue 磯水絵, Setsuwa to ongaku denshō 『説話と音楽伝承』 [The musical transmission of medieval tales], Izumi Shoin 和泉書院.
- 2001: Aoyagi Takashi 青柳隆志, Nihon rōei-shi nenpyō-hen 『日本朗詠史 年表篇』[The history of Japanese Rōei: chronology], Kasama Shoin 笠間書院.
- 2002: Negishi Masami 根岸正海, Miyakoji-bushi no kenkyū『宮古路節の研究』[Research on Miyakoji-bushi], Nansōsha 南窓社.
  Fukuoka Madoka 福岡まどか, Jawa no kamen buyō『ジャワの仮面舞踊』[Masked Dance in Java], Keisō Shoin 勁草書房.
- 2003: Takakuwa Izumi 高桑いづみ, Nō no hayashi to enshutsu 『能の囃子と演出』[The accompaniment and production of Noh], Ongaku no Tomosha 音楽之友社.
- 2004: Yamaguchi Osamu 山口修, Ōyō ongaku-gaku to minzoku ongakugaku 『応用音楽学と民族音楽学』[Applied musicology and ethnomusicology], Nihon Hōsō Shuppankai 日本放送出版協会.
  Konjō Atsushi 金城厚, Okinawa ongaku no kōzō: kashi rizumu gakushiki no riron 『沖縄音楽の構造――歌詞リズムと学識の理論』[The structure of Okinawan music: the meter of song texts and the theory of knowledge], Daiichi Shobō 第一書房.
- 2005: Endō Tōru 遠藤徹, Heianchō no gagaku: kogakufu ni yoru tōgakkyoku no ongakuteki kenkyū 『平安朝の雅楽――古楽譜による唐楽曲の楽理的研究』[Court music during the Heian period: musicological study of Chinese-style court music based on ancient scores], Tōkyōdō Shuppan 東京堂出版.
  Yokomichi Mario 横道萬里雄, Taigen geijutsu toshite mita teragoto no kōzō 『体現芸術として見た寺事の構造』[The structure of teragoto seen as embodied art], Iwanami Shoten 岩波書店.
- 2006: Takeuchi Emiko 武内恵美子, Kabuki hayashi-kata no gakushiron-teki kenkyū: kinsei kamigata o chūsin toshite 『歌舞伎囃子方の楽師論的研究ーー近世上方を中心として』[Research on the theories of performers of the accompaniment to kabuki: focusing on western Japan during the Edo period], Izumi Shoin 和泉書院.
- 2007: Gerald Groemer ジェラルド・グローマー, Goze to goze-uta no kenkyū 『瞽女と瞽女唄の研究』 [A study of blind female Japanese musicians and their songs], 2 vols., Nagoya Daigaku Shuppankai 名古屋大学出版会.
  Tani Masato 谷正人 Iran no ongaku: koe no bunka to sokkyō' 『イランの音楽 声の文化と即興』 [The music of Iran: Vocal music and the culture of improvisation], Seidosha 青土社.
- 2008: Tanaka Takako 田中多佳子, Hindu kyōto no shūdan kayō: kami to hito tono rensa 『ヒンドゥー教徒の集団歌謡－神と人との連鎖』 [The ensemble songs of Hindus: between man and the gods], Sekai Shisōsha 世界思想社.
- 2009: Hugh de Ferranti, The Last Biwa Singer: A Blind Musician in History, Imagination and Performance, Ithaca, New York: Cornell East Asia Series.
  Tsukahara Yasuko 塚原康子, Meiji kokka to gagaku: Dentō no kindaika, kokugaku no sōsei 『明治国家と雅楽ーー伝統の近代化、国楽の創成』 [The Meiji state and gagaku: the modernization of tradition and the creation of a national music], Yūshisha 有志社.
- 2010: Nishio Tetsuo 西尾哲夫、Mizuno Nobuo 水野信男、Horiuchi Masaki 堀内正樹, eds., Arabu no oto bunka: Global communication e no izanai 『アラブの音文化ーーグローバルコミュニケーションへのいざない』 [Arab sound culture: An invitation to global communication], Sutairu Nōto スタイルノート.
- 2011: Gamō Satoaki 蒲生郷昭, Shoki shamisen no kenkyū 『初期三味線の研究』 [Research on the early shamisen]. Shuppan Geijutsu-sha 出版芸術社.
