= Hiizu Iwamura =

Japanese chemist

- Hiizu Iwamura, 2009
- Born: 17 December 1934 (age 91); Tokyo, Japan
- Education: University of Tokyo
- Known for: Organic Molecule-based Magnets
- Awards: The Japan Academy Prize (2003)
- Scientific career
- Workplaces: Nihon University
- Doctoral advisor: Michinori Oki

Hiizu Iwamura (岩村 秀, Iwamura Hiizu; born 17 December 1934) is a Japanese chemist and Professor of Chemistry, Nihon University, as well as Professor Emeriti of the Institute for Molecular Science in Okazaki, the University of Tokyo, and Kyushu University in Japan.

== Education ==
- 1957 B.S. Faculty of Science, The University of Tokyo
- 1962 D.Sci. in Chemistry, The University of Tokyo

Thesis: Intramolecular Hydrogen Bonding between Hydroxy Group and π-Electron Systems (Supervisors: Professors Yoshiyuki Urushibara and Michinori Oki)

== Academic experience ==
- 1962-1966 Assistant Professor, The University of Tokyo
- 1966-1969 Lecturer, The University of Tokyo
- 1967-1969 Research Associate, University of Wisconsin (with Prof Howard E. Zimmerman)
- 1970-1977 Associate Professor, The University of Tokyo
- November 1974-January 1975 DAAD Visiting Professor, University of Tübingen, Germany
- 1977-1988 Professor, Institute for Molecular Science, 1978-1987 Director of Division of Applied Molecular Science
- 1983-1985 Adjunct Professor, Faculty of Engineering, Nagoya University
- 1987-1995 Professor, The University of Tokyo
- November, 1987 Visiting Professor, University of Chicago
- 1994-1998 Professor, Kyushu University, 1995-1998 Director, Institute for Fundamental Research in Organic Chemistry, Kyushu University
- April–May, 1995 Visiting Professor, Louis Pasteur University, France
- 1998-2000 Professor, National Institution for Academic Degrees
- 2000-2005 Professor, University of the Air, 2001-2005 Director of Tokyo Bunkyo Study Center
- 2005-2010 Professor, Advanced Research Institute of Science and Humanity, Nihon University
- 2010–present Professor, College of Science and Technology, Nihon University

== Professional activities ==
- 1979-1989 Associate and Titular Member, Commission on Organic Photochemistry, Division of Organic Chemistry, IUPAC
- 1992-1994 Member of the Board of Directors of the Chemical Society of Japan
- 1993-1994 Chairman, Kanto Section of the Chemical Society of Japan
- 1999-2012 Chairperson of the Committee for Validation and Examination for Degrees, National Institution for Academic Degrees and University Evaluation
- 2000-2005 Member of the Science Council of Japan
- 2005-2011 Corresponding Member of the Science Council of Japan
- March 2000-February 2001 President Elect, the Chemical Society of Japan
- March 2001-February 2002 President, The Chemical Society of Japan
- 2007-2008 The First President, Japan Union of Chemical Science and Technology

== Journals involvement ==
- 1987-1996 Journal of Physical Organic Chemistry Editorial Board
- 1987-1992 New Journal of Chemistry, France, Advisory Board
- 1987-1999 Advances in Physical Organic Chemistry, Advisory Board
- 1988-2000 Chemical Reviews (American Chemical Society), Editorial Advisory Board

== Chairmanship of conferences and symposia ==
- June 1982 Oji International Seminar on Chemistry of Weak Molecular Interactions in Aichi
- October 1992 International Conference on Chemistry and Physics of Molecule-Based Magnetic Materials in Tokyo
- 1990-1995 The Chemical Society of Japan Executive Committee for 1995-Chemical Congress of The Pacific Basin Societies in Honolulu
- 1995 The 6th Kyushu International Symposium on Physical Organic Chemistry
- 1995-2000 Vice-Chairman, 2000 Chemical Congress of the Pacific Basin Societies in Honolulu
- September 1996 The 1st Gordon Research Conference on Organic Structure and Properties in Fukuoka

== Awards and honors ==
- 1963 The Chemical Society of Japan Award for Young Scientist
- November 1987 Julia and Edward Lee Lectureship from the University of Chicago
- 1992 The Chemical Society of Japan Award
- 1996 Purple Ribbon Medal of Japan (Shiju Hosho)
- 1998 Fujiwara Science Award
- 2001 Maria Sklodowska-Curie Medal from the Polish Chemical Society
- 2003 The Japan Academy Prize
- 2010 The Order of the Sacred Treasure

== Major research interest and accomplishments ==
- Organic molecule-based magnets, Radical and carbene chemistry, Correlated internal rotation (molecular gears), Organic reactions in sub- and supercritical water.
  - In 1984 he prepared hydrocarbon tri-carbene and tetra-carbene to demonstrate that their 2p-electron spins aligned in parallel and paramagnetic moments became greater than those of iron(III) and Gd(III) salts due to five 3d- and seven 4f-electron spins, respectively. The highest spin nona-carbene ever prepared had a S = 9 ground state (1993). Aminoxyl radicals and pyridylcarbenes were assembled into polymers by coordination with magnetic metal ions to give mixed metal-organic molecule-based magnets. They included a ferromagnet with the Curie temperature of 46 K (1996) and photomagnets where only the irradiated part become strongly magnetic (1997).
  - Earlier he designed and prepared a whole series of di-(9-triptycyl)X (X=CH_{2}, NH, O, SiH_{2}, S) as molecular cog-wheels and demonstrated that they undergo almost free correlated internal rotation (disrotation) by various physical and chemical measurements. Since the rapid internal rotation of the cog-wheels does not get off the track, the di-9-triptycyl compounds carrying different benzene ring(s) gave isolable stereoisomers due to the phase of the label in spite of the rapid internal rotation (1980).
  - More recently he developed a number of preparative organic reactions that proceed by way of aldol condensation and Michael addition in sub- or supercritical water in the absence of any added catalysts.

== Selected bibliography ==
- “Magnetic Behavior of Nonet Tetracarbene m-Phenylenebis[(diphenylmethylenen-3-yl)methylene]”, T. Sugawara, S. Bandow, K. Kimura, H. Iwamura, and K. Itoh, J. Am. Chem. Soc., 106 (1984) 6449-6450.
- “High-spin organic molecules and spin alignment in organic molecular assemblies“, H. Iwamura, Adv. Phys. Org. Chem. 26 (1990) 179-253.
- “A Branched-Chain Nonacarbene with a Nonadecet Ground State: A Step Nearer to Superparamagnetic Polycarbenes“, N. Nakamura, K. Inoue, and H. Iwamura, Angew. Chem., Inter. Ed. Engl., 32 (1993) 872-874.
- “Studies of Organic Di-, Oligo-, and Polyradicals by Means of Their Bulk Magnetic Properties“, H. Iwamura and N. Koga, Acc. Chem. Res. 26, 346-351 (1993).
- “Toward Dendritic Two-Dimensional Polycarbenes: Synthesis of "Starburst"-Type Nona- and Dodecadiazo Compound and Magnetic Study of Their Photoproduct”, K. Matsuda, N. Nakamura, K. Inoue, N. Koga, and H. Iwamura, Bull. Chem. Soc. Jpn. 69 (1996) 1483-1494.
- “High-Spin Polynitroxide Radicals as Versatile Bridging Ligands for Transition Metal Complexes with High Ferri-/Ferromagnetic TC”, H. Iwamura, K. Inoue, and T. Hayamizu, Pure Appl. Chem. 68 (1996) 243-252.
- “Formation of Ferromagnetic Chains by Photolysis of 1:1 Complexes of Bis(hexafluoro-acetylacetonato)copper(II) with Diazodi(4-pyridyl)methane”, Y. Sano, M. Tanaka, N. Koga, K. Matsuda, H. Iwamura, P. Rabu, and M. Drillon, J. Am. Chem. Soc. 119 (1997) 8246-8252.
- “Magnetic Ordering in Metal Coordination Complexes with Aminoxyl Radicals”, H. Iwamura and K. Inoue, in Magnetism; Molecules to Materials II. Molecule-Based Materials, J. Miller and M. Drillon, Eds.; Wiley-VCH: Weinheim, Germany; Chapt. 2 (2001) 61-108.
- “Organic Synthetic and Supramolecular Approaches to Free Radical-based Magnets”, H. Iwamura, Proc. Japan Acad., 81, Ser. B (2005) 233-243.
- “What role has organic chemistry played in the development of molecule-based magnets?” H. Iwamura, Polyhedron 66 (2013) 3–14.
- “Unconventional Synthesis and Conformational Flexibility of Bis(1-triptycyl) Ether”, Y. Kawada and H. Iwamura, J. Org. Chem., 45 (1980) 2547-2548.
- “Crystal and Molecular Structure of Bis(9-triptycyl) Ether”, H. Iwamura, T. Ito, H. Ito, K. Toriumi, Y. Kawada, E. Osawa, T. Fujiyoshi, and C. Jaime, J. Am. Chem. Soc. 106, (1984) 4712-4717.
- “Stereochemical Consequences of Dynamic Gearing”, H. Iwamura and K. Mislow, Acc. Chem. Res., 21 (1988) 175-182.
- “Organic Reactions in Sub- and Supercritical Water in the Absence of Any Added Catalyst”, H. Iwamura, T. Sato, M. Okada, K. Sue and T. Hiaki, J. Res. Inst. Sci. Tech., Nihon Univ., 132 (2014) 1–9.
