= Hisao Tanabe =

Japanese musicologist (1883–1984)

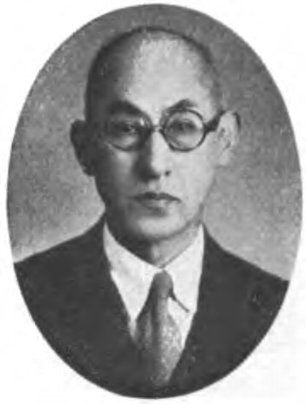
Tanabe Hisao

Hisao Tanabe (田辺 尚雄, Tanabe Hisao; August 16, 1883 – March 5, 1984) was a Japanese musicologist responsible for initiating the study of Asian music in Japan.

== Career ==
Hisao was learning the principles of musicology from a French missionary when he began his studies in 1920, researching the musical traditions of the Imperial House of Japan. In April 1921, he visited Korea and played an important role in rescuing the threatened music tradition of the Joseon court. Though the Japanese government had dissolved Korea's Royal Music Institute, forcing it to rely on private sponsorship, he successfully argued that "traditional music and dance like aak will be lost forever if it is not supported" by the Japanese government. He took film and audio recordings, and published a widely circulated report extolling Korea's court music and comparing it to Japanese court practice. Later in 1921, he invented a new type of kokyū for playing high notes.

In 1981, he was honored as a Person of Cultural Merit. The Tanabe Hisao Prize was named in his honor.
