= Person of Cultural Merit =

Japanese recognition and honor

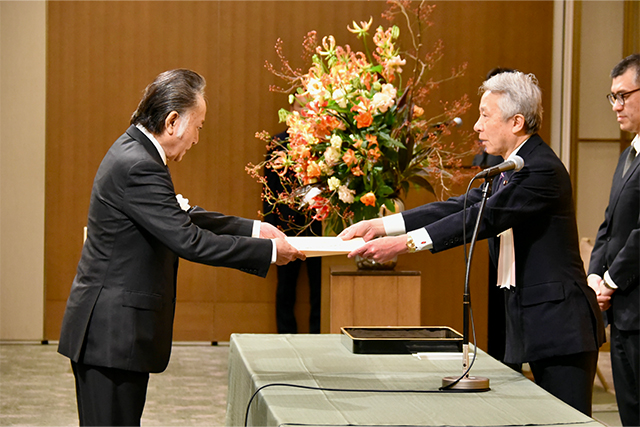
Award Ceremony for the Persons of Cultural Merit (November 6, 2023). Actor Kin'ya Kitaōji receives the award.

Person of Cultural Merit (Japanese: 文化功労者, Hepburn: Bunka Kōrōsha) is an official Japanese recognition and honour which is awarded annually to select people who have made outstanding cultural contributions. This distinction is intended to play a role as a part of a system of support measures for the promotion of creative activities in Japan. By 1999, 576 people had been selected as Persons of Cultural Merit.

== System of recognition ==
The Order of Culture and Persons of Cultural Merit function in tandem to honor those who have contributed to the advancement and development of Japanese culture in a variety of fields, including academia, arts, science and sports.

=== Persons of Cultural Merit ===
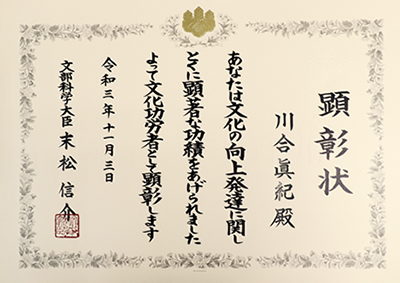
Certificate of the Person of Cultural Merit (for Maki Kawai, November 3, 2021)

The 1951 Law on Pensions for the Persons of Cultural Merit honors persons of cultural merit by providing a special government-sponsored pension. Since 1955, the new honorees have been announced on the same day as the award ceremony for the Order of Culture.

=== Order of Culture ===
The award ceremony, which takes place at the Imperial Palace on the Day of Culture (November 3). Candidates for the Order of Culture are selected from the Persons of Cultural Merit by the Minister of Education, Culture, Sports, Science and Technology, who then recommends the candidates to the Prime Minister. The final decisions are made by the Cabinet.

== Selected recipients ==
- Makoto Asashima, developmental biologist
- Seiji Ozawa, conductor
- Hisao Domoto, abstract painter
- Toru Funamura, composer
- Toshi Ichiyanagi, composer
- Akira Isogai, bio-organic chemistry researcher
- Tota Kaneko, haiku poet
- Asami Maki, choreographer
- Kyoko Matsuoka, author and translator
- Makoto Nagao, information engineering
- Tomijuro Nakamura, Kabuki actor
- Tatsuo Nishida, linguist
- Man Nomura, Kyogen actor
- Sayume Okuda, craftswoman
- Hiroyuki Sakaki, electronic engineer
- Koichi Shimoda, physicist
- Kiichi Sumikawa, sculptor
- Kenichi Tominaga, economic sociologist
- Naoya Shiga (1951), author
- Hideki Yukawa (1951), physicist
- Masuji Ibuse (1966), author (for the work Black Rain)
- Haruko Sugimura (1974), actress
- Motoo Ōtaguro (1977), music critic
- Susumu Tonegawa (1983), medical researcher
- Hisaya Morishige (1984), actor
- Fuku Akino (1991), Nihonga painter
- Ryotaro Shiba (1991), writer
- Isuzu Yamada (1993), actress
- Migishi Setsuko (1994), painter
- Jakucho Setouchi (1997), Buddhist nun and author
- Mitsuko Mori (1998), actress
- Koji Nakanishi (1999), chemist
- Marius Berthus Jansen (1999), historian
- Ito Masami (2000), judge
- Ishimura Uzaemon XVII (2000), Kabuki actor
- Shotaro Yasuoka (2001), writer
- Donald Keene (2002), educator
- Akira Ifukube (2003), composer
- Shozo Shimada (2004), artist
- Ken Takakura (2006), actor
- Tatsuya Nakadai (2007), actor
- Makoto Asashima (2008), biologist
- Nakamura Tomijyuro V (2008), Kabuki actor
- Taiho Koki (2009), sumo wrestler
- Yoshihide Kozai (2009), astronomer
- Sayuri Yoshinaga (2010), actress
- Hideji Ōtaki (2011), actor
- Matsumoto Kōshirō IX (2012), Kabuki actor
- Hayao Miyazaki (2012), animator, filmmaker and manga artist
- Shun'ichi Amari (2012), mathematician
- Hiroko Takenishi (2012), author
- Mitsumasa Anno (2012), artist, children's author
- Keiji Morokuma (2012), theoretical and computational chemist
- Nobutaka Hirokawa (2013), neuroscientist and cell biologist
- Tamio Yamakawa (2014), biochemist
- Tsuneko Okazaki (2015), molecular biologist
- Tsumura Setsuko (2016), novelist
- Nakamura Kichiemon II (2017), Kabuki actor
- Mutsuo Takahashi (2017), poet
- Hisashi Yamamoto (2018), chemist
- Moto Hagio (2019), manga artist
- Shigeru Miyamoto (2019), video game developer
- Koichi Sugiyama (2020), composer
- Nobuhiro Kiyotaki (2020), economist
- Kazuo Yamaguchi(2020), sociologist
- Masatoshi Sakai (2020), record producer
- Yoshiyuki Tomino (2021), anime director, screenwriter, songwriter and novelist
- Masako Nozawa (2025), voice actress

== See also ==
- Cross of Honour for Science and Art, First Class (Austria)
- Italian Medal of Merit for Culture and Art
- Living National Treasure (Japan)
- Order of Arts and Letters of Spain
- Order of Honour (Russia)
- Order of the Companions of Honour (UK)
- Ordre des Arts et des Lettres (France)
- Pour le Mérite (Germany; recognised by the state, though not a state order)
