= AQS =

AQS may refer to:

- Aviation Quality Services, a division of Lufthansa Flight Training
- AQS Inc., manufacturer of the main circuit board for the Novena (computing platform) open-source laptop computer
- AQS-13, a series of US Navy helicopter dipping sonars
