= Galfenol =

Alloy of iron and gallium

In materials science, galfenol is the general term for an alloy of iron and gallium. The name was first given to iron-gallium alloys by United States Navy researchers in 1998 when they discovered that adding gallium to iron could amplify iron's magnetostrictive effect up to tenfold. Galfenol is of interest to sonar researchers because magnetostrictor materials are used to detect sound, and amplifying the magnetostrictive effect could lead to better sensitivity of sonar detectors. Galfenol is also proposed for vibrational energy harvesting, actuators for precision machine tools, active anti-vibration systems, and anti-clogging devices for sifting screens and spray nozzles. Galfenol is machinable and can be produced in sheet and wire form.

In 2009, scientists from Virginia Polytechnic Institute and State University, and National Institute of Standards and Technology (NIST) used neutron beams to determine the structure of galfenol. They determined that the addition of gallium changes the lattice structure of the iron atoms from regular cubic cells to one in which the faces of some of the cells become slightly rectangular. The elongated cells tend to clump together in the alloy, forming localized clumps within the material. These clumps have been described by Peter Gehring of the NIST Center for Neutron Research as "something like raisins within a cake". It has also been proposed that there is an intrinsic mechanism generating this enhanced magnetostriction, which has its origins in the electronic structure of the material as described by density functional theory. It is understood that the addition of gallium to pure iron alters the electronic structure and atomic arrangements in the material in such a way as to enhance the material's magnetoelastic constant.

== See also ==
- Terfenol-D
