= Terfenol-D =

Magnetostrictive alloy

Terfenol-D, an alloy of the formula Tb_{x}Dy_{1−x}Fe_{2} (x ≈ 0.3), is a magnetostrictive material. It was initially developed in the 1970s by the Naval Ordnance Laboratory in the United States. The technology for manufacturing the material efficiently was developed in the 1980s at Ames Laboratory under a U.S. Navy-funded program. It is named after terbium, iron (Fe), Naval Ordnance Laboratory (NOL), and the D comes from dysprosium.

== Physical properties ==
The alloy has the highest magnetostriction of any alloy, up to 0.002 m/m at saturation; it expands and contracts in a magnetic field. Terfenol-D has a large magnetostriction force, high energy density, low sound velocity, and a low Young's modulus. At its most pure form, it also has low ductility and a low fracture resistance. Terfenol-D is a gray alloy that has different possible ratios of its elemental components that always follow a formula of Tb_{x}Dy_{1−x}Fe_{2}. The addition of dysprosium made it easier to induce magnetostrictive responses by making the alloy require a lower level of magnetic fields. When the ratio of Tb and Dy is increased, the resulting alloy's magnetostrictive properties will operate at temperatures as low as −200 °C, and when decreased, it may operate at a maximum of 200 °C. The composition of Terfenol-D allows it to have a large magnetostriction and magnetic flux when a magnetic field is applied to it. This case exists for a large range of compressive stresses, with a trend of decreasing magnetostriction as the compressive stress increases. Crush strength has been shown (unpublished) to be quite high under certain conditions. There is also a relationship between the magnetic flux and compression in which when the compressive stress increases, the magnetic flux changes less drastically. Terfenol-D is mostly used for its magnetostrictive properties, in which it changes shape when exposed to magnetic fields in a process called magnetization. Magnetic heat treatment is shown to improve the magnetostrictive properties of Terfenol-D at low compressive stress for certain ratios of Tb and Dy.

== Applications ==
Due to its material properties, Terfenol-D is excellent for use in the manufacturing of low frequency, high powered underwater acoustics. Its initial application was in naval sonar systems. It sees application in magnetomechanical sensors, actuators, and acoustic and ultrasonic transducers due to its high energy density and large bandwidth capabilities, e.g. in the SoundBug device (its first commercial application by FeONIC). Its strain is also larger than that of another normally used material (PZT8), which allows Terfenol-D transducers to reach greater depths for ocean explorations than past transducers. Its low Young's modulus brings some complications due to compression at large depths, which are overcome in transducer designs that may reach 1000 ft in depth and only lose a small amount of accuracy of around 1 dB. Due to its high temperature range, Terfenol-D is also useful in deep hole acoustic transducers where the environment may reach high pressure and temperatures like oil holes. Terfenol-D may also be used for hydraulic valve drivers due to its high strain and high force properties. Similarly, magnetostrictive actuators have also been considered for use in fuel injectors for diesel engines because of the high stresses that can be produced. Terfenol-D uniquely combines key characteristics that enable advanced diesel fuel injection. First, the quantum mechanical origin of magnetostriction means this effect does not degrade, giving it robustness and durability. Second, it makes good use of the compression available from diesel fuel pressure. Finally, its mechanical expansion tends to be proportional to the imposed magnetic field, making injector needle position continuously controllable. An injector needle directly operated by Terfenol-D can have lifetime durability on an engine cylinder head while enabling unprecedented control over each injection event throughout its entire duration. These properties can be used for in-cylinder treatment of efficiency, emissions, and noise while enabling fuel flexibility.

== Manufacturing ==
The increase in use of Terfenol-D in transducers required new production techniques that increased production rates and quality because the original methods were unreliable and small scale. There are four methods that are used to produce Terfenol-D, which are free stand zone melting, modified Bridgman, sintered powder compact, and polymer matrix composites.

The first two methods, free stand zone melting (FSZM) and modified Bridgman (MB), are capable of producing Terfenol-D that has high magnetostrictive properties and energy densities. However, FSZM cannot produce a rod larger than 8 mm in diameter due to the surface tension of the Terfenol-D and how the FSZM process has no container to restrict the material. The MB process offers a minimum of 10 mm diameter size and is only restricted due to the wall interfering with the crystal growth. Both methods create solid crystals that require later manufacturing if a geometry other than a right-angle cylinder is needed. The solid crystals produced have a fine lamellar structure.

The other two techniques, sintered powder compact and polymer matrix composites, are powder based. These techniques allow for intricate geometry and detail. However, the size is limited to 10mm in diameter and 100mm in length due to the molds used. The resulting microstructures of these powder based methods differ from the solid crystal ones because they do not have a lamellar structure and have a lower density. However, all methods have similar magnetostrictive properties.

Due to size restriction, MB is the best process to produce Terfenol-D. However it is a labor-intensive method. A newer process like MB is Etrema crystal grower (ECG) that results in larger diameter Terfenol-D crystals and increased magnetostrictive performance. The reliability of magnetostrictive properties of the Terfenol-D throughout the life of the material is increased by using ECG.

Terfenol-D has some minor drawbacks which stem from its material properties. Terfenol-D has low ductility and low fracture resistance. To solve this, Terfenol-D has been added to polymers and other metals to create composites. When added to polymers, the stiffness of the resulting composite is low. When composites of Terfenol-D with ductile metal binders are created, the resulting material has increased stiffness and ductility with reduced magnetostrictive properties. These metal composites may be formed by explosion compaction. In a study done on processing Terfenol-D alloys, the resulting alloys created using copper and Terfenol-D had increased strength and hardness values, which supports the theory that the composites of ductile metal binders and Terfenol-D result in a stronger and more ductile material.

== See also ==
- Galfenol
