= Tonpilz =

Type of underwater electro-acoustic transducer

The term tonpilz or "acoustic mushroom" may refer to a certain type of underwater electro-acoustic transducer. By sandwiching active (i.e. piezoelectric or magnetostrictive) materials between a light, stiff radiating head mass and a heavy tail mass, the transducer can effectively operate as either a projector (source) or a hydrophone (underwater acoustic receiver). The transducer's size, odd shape, and acoustic projection capabilities have earned it the moniker "tonpilz", from the German words Ton (tone) and Pilz (mushroom) and from the figurative similarity.

Typically, tonpilz transducers are used in sonar applications. To maximize efficiency, transducers are often placed in arrays: a grid of sometimes hundreds of transducers. This arrangement also allows beamforming and steering.

Transducers of this form also lend themselves to compensation against the hydrostatic pressures encountered in sonar, particularly for submarine applications.

"Acoustic mushroom" may also refer to a passive ceiling or wall treatment applied to the insides of concert auditoria, such as the Royal Albert Hall.

== Bibliography ==
Stansfield, D. (1991). Underwater Electroacoustic Transducers. Peninsula Publishing.
