= Sendust =

Magnetic metal powder, alternative to permalloy

Sendust is a magnetic metal powder that was invented by Hakaru Masumoto at Tohoku Imperial University in Sendai, Japan circa 1936 as an alternative to permalloy in inductor applications for telephone networks. Sendust composition is typically 85% iron, 9% silicon and 6% aluminium. The powder is sintered into cores to manufacture inductors. Sendust cores have high magnetic permeability (up to 140 000), low loss, low coercivity (5 A/m) good temperature stability and saturation flux density up to 1 T.

Due to its chemical composition and crystallographic structure Sendust exhibits simultaneously zero magnetostriction and zero magnetocrystalline anisotropy constant K_{1}.

Sendust is harder than permalloy, and is thus useful in abrasive wear applications such as magnetic recording heads.

== See also ==
- Alperm
