= Emilio Villari =

Italian physicist (1836–1904)

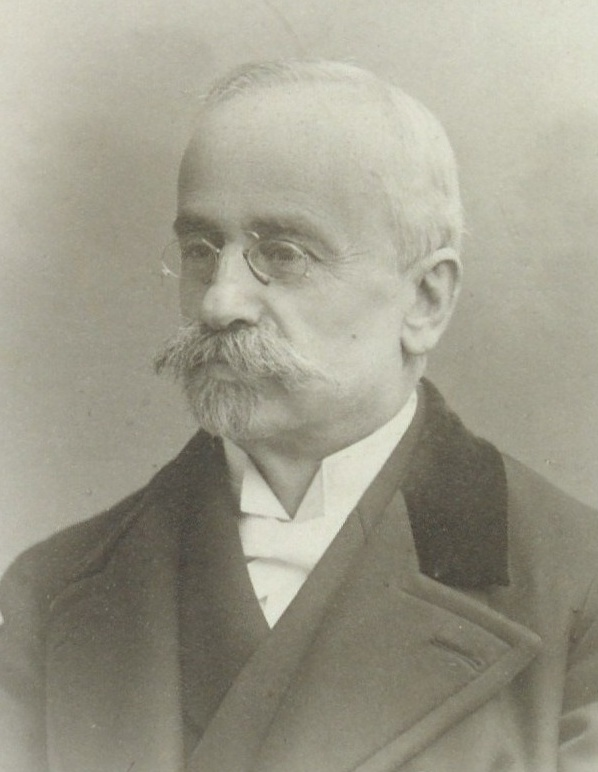
- Born: September 25, 1836
- Died: August 20, 1904 (aged 67)
- Education: University of Pisa
- Known for: Villari effect
- Awards: Matteucci Medal (1884)
- Scientific career
- Fields: Experimental physics
- Workplaces: University of Bologna

Emilio Villari (25 September 1836 – 20 August 1904) was an Italian experimental physicist and a professor at the University of Bologna and later Naples who contributed to studies on electromagnetism after whom is named the Villari effect which is used in devices used to measure mechanical stress and strain. He also developed a quadrant electrometer.

== Early life ==
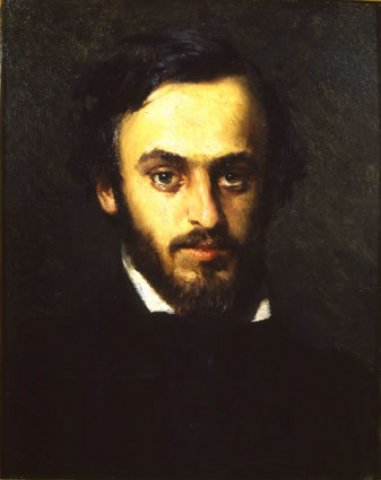
Portrait (c. 1858) by Domenico Morelli who married Villari's sister

Villari came from a wealthy family, his father was a lawyer and an older sibling was Pasquale Villari. Suffering from epileptic seizures from an early age he was privately educated in Naples including in literature under Leopoldo Rodino, math under Achille Sannia and physics from Luigi Palmieri. He then went to the University of Pisa where his brother Pasquale taught. He studied medicine initially but was influenced by Riccardo Felici to shift to physics.

== Career ==
Villari spent some time in Germany in the laboratory of Gustav Magnus before joining the University of Bologna in 1871 as professor of physics. In 1900 he moved to Naples to succeed Gilberto Govi. In 1873 he examined why alternating current causes greater heat generation in metals than direct current. Villari suggested that this was due to the existence of molecular magnets and their resistance to induced electromagnetism and differed in his theory from that of James Clerk Maxwell and Lord Kelvin. He examined the expansion of ferromagnetic materials under electromagnetism and discovered the reverse effect as well which is sometimes known as the Villari effect. The Villari effect is put into application in strain sensors in a wide range of engineering situations. In 1901 he published on the effect of X-rays on the ionizability of air. He constructed electroscopes and observed the effect of (radiation from) pitchblende on discharges. Other experiments were on electrical capacitance, the elasticity of rubber, and the flow of liquids like mercury through tubes. Most of his experimental work was published in the journal Il Nuovo Cimento (1877-1894). Adolfo Bartoli worked on radiation thermodynamics with Villari in Bologna for some time. Augusto Righi worked as an assistant to Villari while Mario Pieri was a student. He was a foreign member of the Royal Society. Villari received the Matteucci Medal for 1884.
