= SoundBug =

Soundbug is a small speaker that can turn a resonant flat surface into a flat panel speaker. The Soundbug is attached to a smooth resonant surface. This surface then acts as speaker. The tone differs depending on the surface (wood, metal, glass etc.). The Soundbug was developed by FeONIC Technology (formerly Newlands Scientific), a commercial research and development company specialising in magnetostrictive audio products as a spin-off from Hull University. FeONIC used the same technology for Whispering Windows, which is able to resonate shop windows.

Soundbug transmits the audio signal to the flat surface by way of a small piece of Terfenol-D, which is a magnetostrictive alloy of rare earth metals and iron. This material, when stimulated with an electrical input, causes the Terfenol to expand slightly, resulting in sound output with a very small amplitude. Once attached to a flat surface, Soundbug will translate electric signals into mechanical energy, causing the flat surface to vibrate and broadcast the sound.
