= Alperm =

Class of alloys with high magnetostriction

Alperm (also alfenol or alfer) is a class of alloys comprising 83-90% of iron and 10-17% of aluminium. The most widely used composition is with 16% Al.

An alloy with 13% Al is also sometimes referred to as alfer. It exhibits large magnetostriction and it is used in magnetoelastic sensors. Later during the WW2, Japanese used the alloy with 12.7-12.9% aluminium as a replacement of nickel for the magnetostrictive transducers used in their Type 93 model 5, Type 3, and Simple naval sonars.

Alperm is magnetically soft and exhibits high magnetic permeability. The material can be produced in 0.5 mm thick sheets, as well as 50-60 μm thick ribbons.

The coercivity is usually below 5 A/m (for alfer it is around 50 A/m) and permeability 55 000 (for alfer 4000). Saturation flux density is 0.8 T (for alfer 1.28 T).

The addition of Al increases electrical resistivity of alloy up to 140 μΩm, which is almost four times the value in commonly used 3% SiFe electrical steel. For this reason alperm can be used in higher frequency range. However, because of the Al content the material is more susceptible to oxidation.

The alloy was first synthesized and characterized by Japanese researchers H. Masumoto and Hideo Saito in 1939.

== See also ==
- Sendust
