= Piezomagnetism =

Ability to induce a magnetic moment by stressing a material

Piezomagnetism is a phenomenon observed in some antiferromagnetic and ferrimagnetic crystals. It is characterized by a linear coupling between the system's magnetic polarization and mechanical strain. In a piezomagnetic material, one may induce a spontaneous magnetic moment by applying mechanical stress, or a physical deformation by applying a magnetic field.

Piezomagnetism differs from the related property of magnetostriction; if an applied magnetic field is reversed in direction, the strain produced changes signs. Additionally, a non-zero piezomagnetic moment can be produced by mechanical strain alone, at zero fields, which is not true of magnetostriction. According to the Institute of Electrical and Electronics Engineers (IEEE):

"Piezomagnetism is the linear magneto-mechanical effect analogous to the linear electromechanical effect of piezoelectricity. Similarly, magnetostriction and electrostriction are analogous second-order effects. These higher-order effects can be represented as effectively first-order when variations in the system parameters are small compared with the initial values of the parameters".

The piezomagnetic effect is made possible by an absence of certain symmetry elements in a crystal structure; specifically, symmetry under time reversal forbids the property.

The first experimental observation of piezomagnetism was made in 1960, in the fluorides of cobalt and manganese.

The strongest piezomagnet known is uranium dioxide, with magnetoelastic memory switching at magnetic fields near 180,000 Oe at temperatures below 30 kelvins.
