= FeONIC =

Feonic Technology Ltd
- Industry: Consumer electronics
- Founded: 1999
- Headquarters: Hull, England
- Key people: Brian Smith (CEO)
- Products: Hi-Fi Public Address Home cinema Loudspeakers Energy Harvesting
- Website: www.feonic.com

Feonic is a commercial company specialising in the design and development of magnetostrictive audio products.

== Products ==
The products use a responsive material that changes shape in a magnetic field. This material was developed for sonar devices by the US Navy but is now commercially available. The products developed by Feonic use the force created by the change in shape of this smart material to vibrate structures such as floors, windows, walls, and the acoustically conductive structures of ships to produce sound.

The company's first consumer product, the SoundBug, led to the successful roll out of the Whispering Window, enabling shop windows to produce sound.

The company has developed a new range of “F Drives” to create flat panel speakers with various applications in the transport, pro-audio, domestic, consumer and commercial markets.

The company markets their products for use in a wide range of environments including train stations, shops, homes, and on boats. Alleged advantages over standalone speakers are described by customers as the systems' efficiency, ability to be integrated into structures and products, resistance to damage, and clarity.

=== Vibration Energy Harvesting ===
Utilising experience from audio, Feonic are developing a vibration energy harvesting device. The energy harvested is used for wireless sending of data - saving wiring and replacement of batteries. Primary market being wheel bearings for locomotives. The Solar Impulse Foundation added Feonic to their list of 1000+ Solutions for a Qualitative Economy.

== History ==
The timeline below summarises how Feonic has developed:

- 1999 Newlands Scientific plc was incorporated to provide research, development and consultancy services in magneto strictive devices and exploit the possibilities of Terfenol-D.
- 2000 Brian Smith was appointed as Managing Director and the product development process began.
- 2002 Soundbug launched at CeBit (the world’s largest technology trade show) and Feonic technology trademarked.
- 2003 Newlands Scientific develops Whispering Window and launches Presenter. Soundbug wins Red Dot design award.
- 2004 Newlands Scientific becomes Feonic plc and wins UK electronics industry design award for best use of technology.
- 2008 New generation F-Drive products are launched and Feonic Transport formed as a joint venture.
- 2019 Feonic Vibration Energy Harvester selected by Solar Impulse Foundation
