= Hakaru Masumoto =

Japanese metallurgist

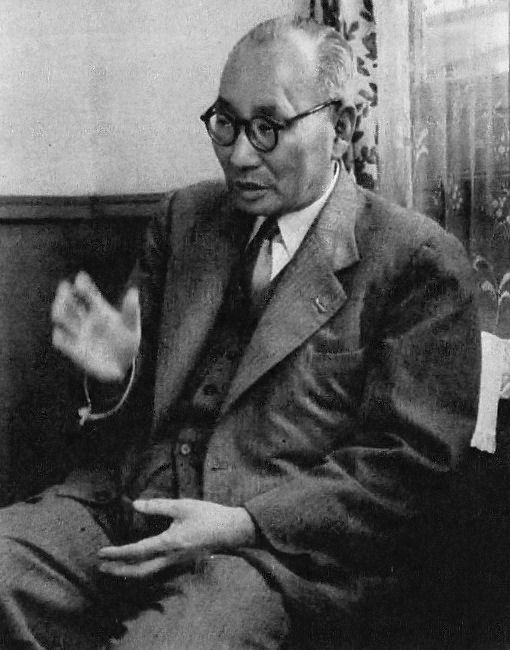

Hakaru Masumoto (1895–1987) was a pioneer in metal and alloy research. He discovered numerous superior and unique alloys, and contributed to improving the performance of precision machinery.

A student of Kotaro Honda, Masumoto developed a magnetic metal powder Sendust in 1936, and was the winner of the Imperial Prize of the Japan Academy in 1946.
