= AN/AQS-13 =

Helicopter dipping sonar system

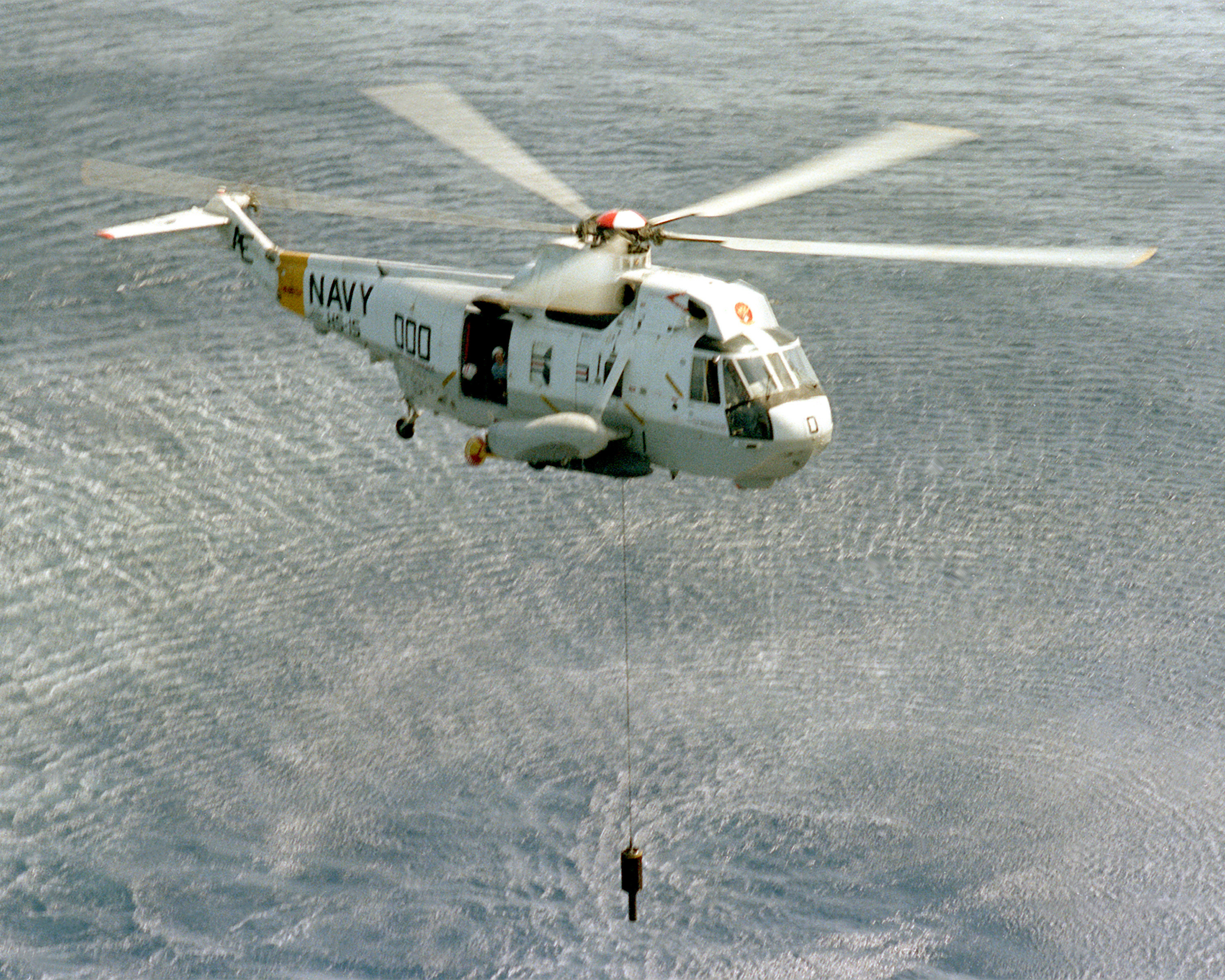
AN/AQS-13 dipping sonar deployed from an SH-3 Sea King

The AN/AQS-13 was a series of helicopter dipping sonar system for the United States Navy. These systems were deployed as the primary inner zone anti-submarine warfare (ASW) sensor on aircraft carrier based helicopters for over five decades. Companion versions with the AN/AQS-18 designation were exported to various nations around the globe.

In accordance with the Joint Electronics Type Designation System (JETDS), the "AN/AQS-13" designation represents the 13th design of an Army-Navy airborne electronic device for detection sonar equipment. The JETDS system also now is used to name all Department of Defense and some NATO electronic systems.

== Purpose ==
Airborne sonar systems provide a light-weight, mobile detection sensor for locating and tracking submarines. Although limited in performance compared to larger, ship-mounted sonars, these helicopter-borne systems have the advantage of rapid deployment/retrieval times, and rapid transition between search areas. Additional advantages over ship sonars include absence of flow noise and engine noise, and the elimination of Doppler shift induced by a moving signal source. Deployed from Aircraft Carriers or other ships, these systems enable the helicopter to locate, identify and attack submerged targets within the flight radius from the home ship.

== Description ==
The AQS-13 systems are all primarily active sonar transmitting in the upper end of the medium frequency sonar range. These systems offered the additional capabilities of voice communication, bathythermography and rudimentary passive sonar. Helicopter borne active sonar has significant advantages over other sensors and is especially effective in the inner zone where noise from the ships of the carrier battle group can interfere with passive sensors. The components of the AQS-13 are informally divided into two groups, the "wet end" and "dry end." The "dry end" involves the processing of the acoustic signals to obtain tactical data. The "wet end" components are those necessary to deploy the acoustic unit into the ocean and retrieve it. These "wet" components include the acoustic elements in a submersible unit, the reel & cable and reeling machine. The hydrophone and projector elements are housed within the submersible unit or transducer. The transducer, also called the "dome", a term borrowed from ship-board sonars, is lowered or "dipped" from the helicopter on a cable by means of the hydraulic reeling machine. The dip depth of the transducer is selected by the operator to achieve the maximum detection probability at the dip location on that particular day as determined by the study of ocean conditions (see Underwater Acoustics). During active search, the acoustic pulse is emitted from the projector assembly. Echos or "returns" are received by the hydrophone, routed through the sonar cable, processed in the aircraft and displayed on a cathode ray tube (CRT) in a plan position indicator (PPI) format. Returns were also processed and made available to the RO-358 chart recorder in the AQS-13E and earlier systems. This data was made available to the aircraft tactical computer in the AQS-13F. The various functions were selectable by the operator, such as pulse lengths, range scales and other modes to enhance operations for the particular conditions. Sensor elements on the reeling machine monitor the relative angle of the deployed sonar cable and provide flight reference signals to the aircraft stabilization equipment in order to maintain a steady hover position over the submerged transducer. Tactical data of the target is obtained from the acoustic returns, including range, bearing and relative speed. Later versions of the AQS-13 were also capable of processing acoustic signals transmitted to the aircraft from sonobuoys.

== History ==
=== AQS-13 ===
The AQS-13 system was introduced to the US fleet aboard the Sikorsky SH-3D anti-submarine warfare helicopter in the mid-1960s. (See military helicopter/maritime helicopters) This was an upgrade from the AQS-10 system carried aboard the SH-3A helicopter. The AQS-13 offered an improved reeling machine and longer cable or "wet-end" than the AQS-10. The "dry-end" components of the system remained essentially the same as the AQS-10. Developed in the 1950s, these components utilized primarily vacuum tube technology. The RO-358 chart recorder provided a means of recording a permanent record of target data as well as additional means for target evaluation.

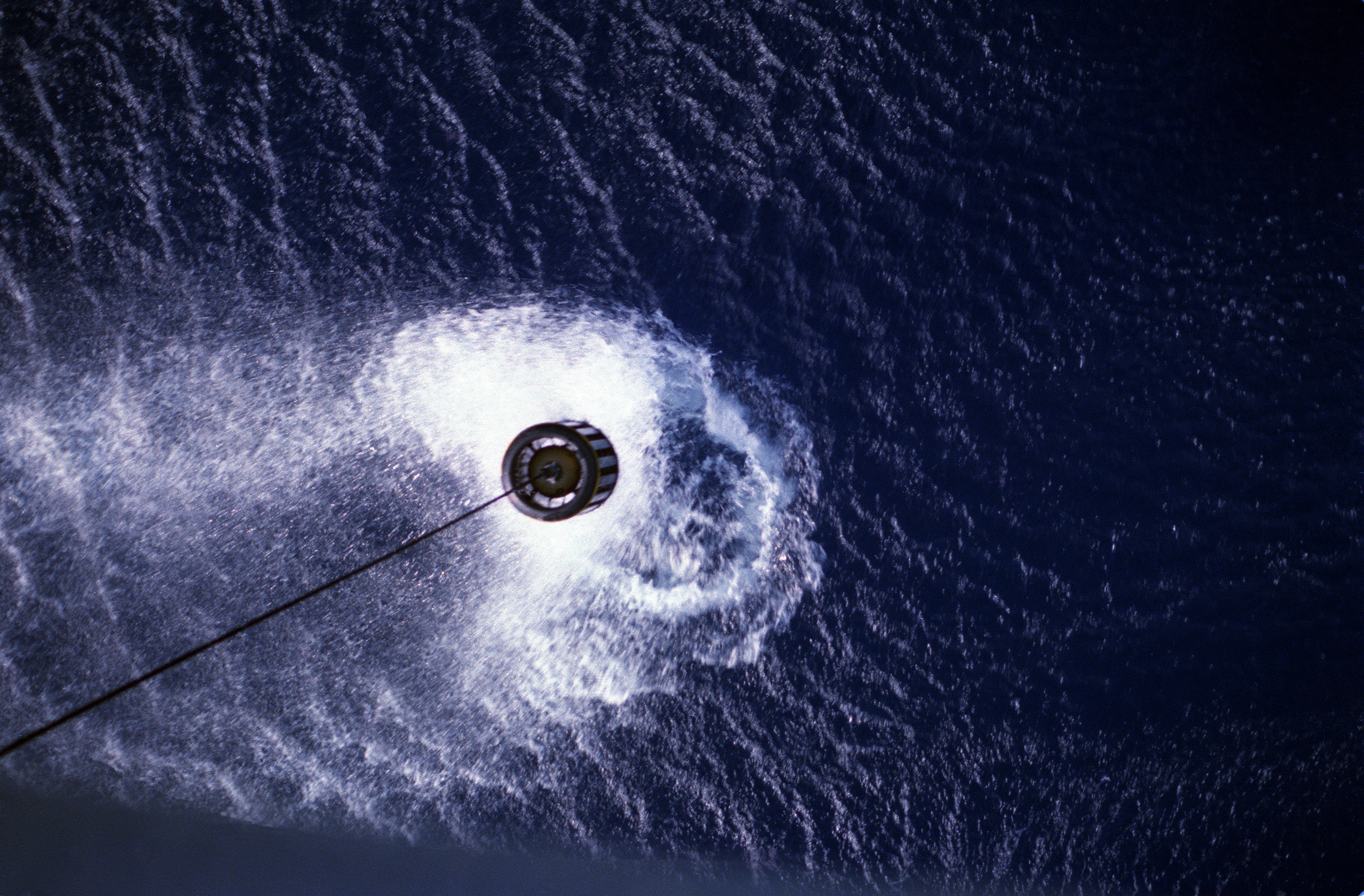
AQS-13A/B/E hydrophone/projector

=== AQS-13A ===
The AQS-13A system was an upgrade to the basic AQS-13 system incorporated into fleet systems in the late-1960s/early-1970s. The upgrade was primarily to incorporate built-in test equipment (BITE) circuitry, providing a method for testing system circuitry in the sonar set.

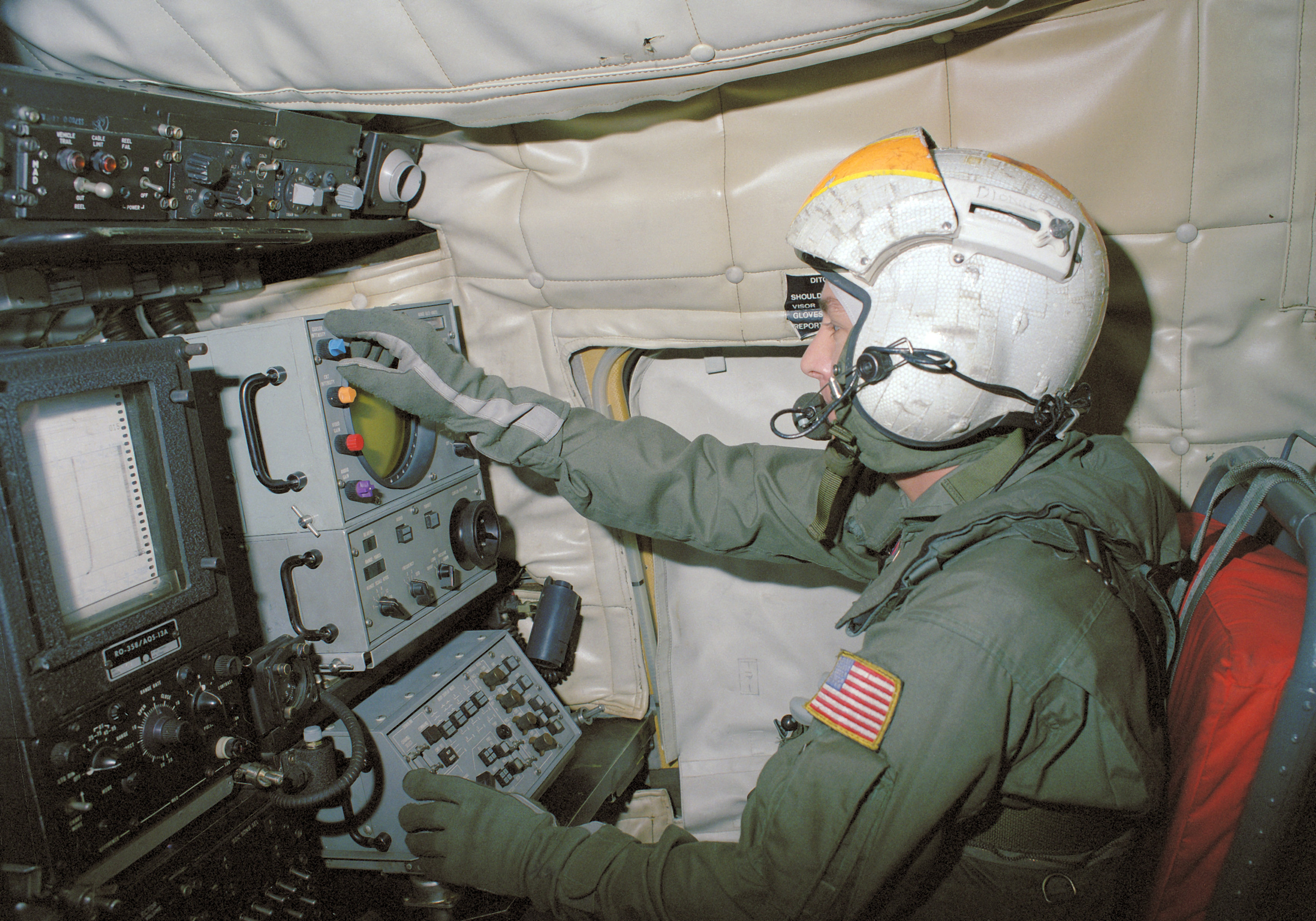
Sonar operator in SH-3H Sea King

=== AQS-13B ===
The AQS-13B system was introduced to the US fleet as standard equipment aboard the Sikorsky SH-3H Sea King helicopter, replacing the SH-3D in the late-1970s. The AQS-13B was a significant upgrade from the AQS-13A. The "dry-end" components were replaced with solid state circuitry in a more compact set of replaceable assemblies. The "wet-end" components were essentially the same as the AQS-13A and the RO-358 was maintained as part of the system. The display remained a standard PPI display. The system was built with the potential to upgrade with an acoustic processor.

=== AQS-13E ===
The AQS-13B system was upgraded to the AQS-13E beginning in the late 1970s and early 1980s with the addition of a sonar data computer. This added the capability to process acoustic sonar and sonobuoy signals digitally while retaining the original analog processing capability. The computer-processed data could be displayed on the system CRT in various formats. Tactical target data derived from the acoustic signals could be transferred electronically from the sonar data computer to the aircraft tactical computer. To enhance target detection, a longer, shaped pulse was used in conjunction with fast Fourier transform processing by the computer. This enhanced the target selection by weighting each target candidate using frequency and duration information to overcome lower signal return strength.

=== AQS-13F ===
The AQS-13F system was introduced to the US fleet as standard equipment aboard the Sikorsky SH-60F Seahawk helicopter, that replaced the SH-3H as the inner-zone ASW platform aboard aircraft carriers in the late-1980s/early-1990s. Key components of the AQS-13F system had origins in the made-for-export AQS-18 sonar developed for the German Navy for use in the Sea Lynx helicopter. The AQS-13F offered improved acoustic processing, a longer transmit pulse, faster reeling machine, longer cable and increased acoustic transmit power. The processed target data could also be displayed on the aircraft multifunction displays and/or recorded via the aircraft mission tape recorder. Due to the limited funding approved by Congress, the aircraft systems were limited to "off the shelf" technology wherever possible. This resulted in the use of a "dry-end" similar to the AQS-13E, even though more modern technology was available.

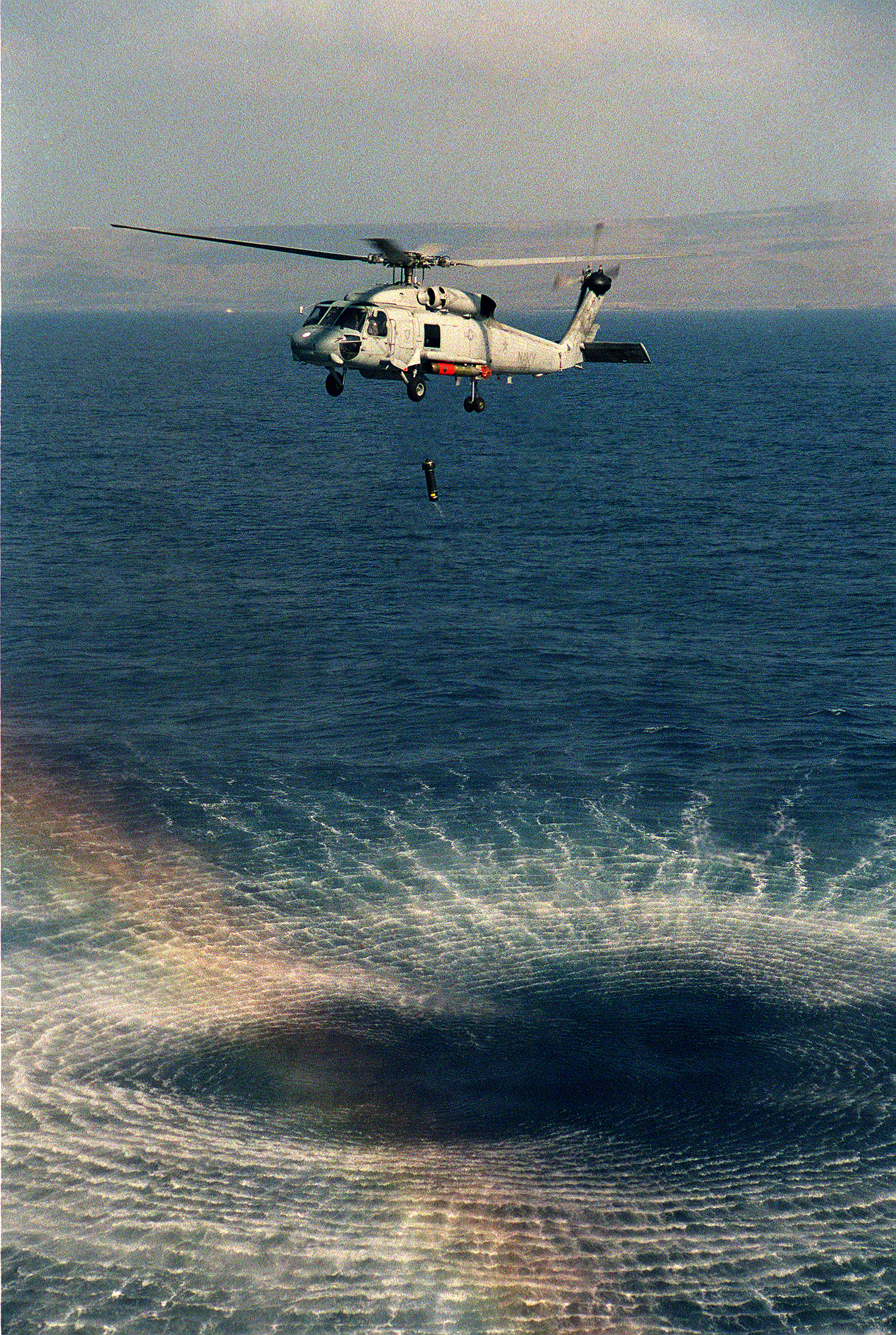
U.S. Navy SH-60F helicopter with AQS-13F transducer deployed

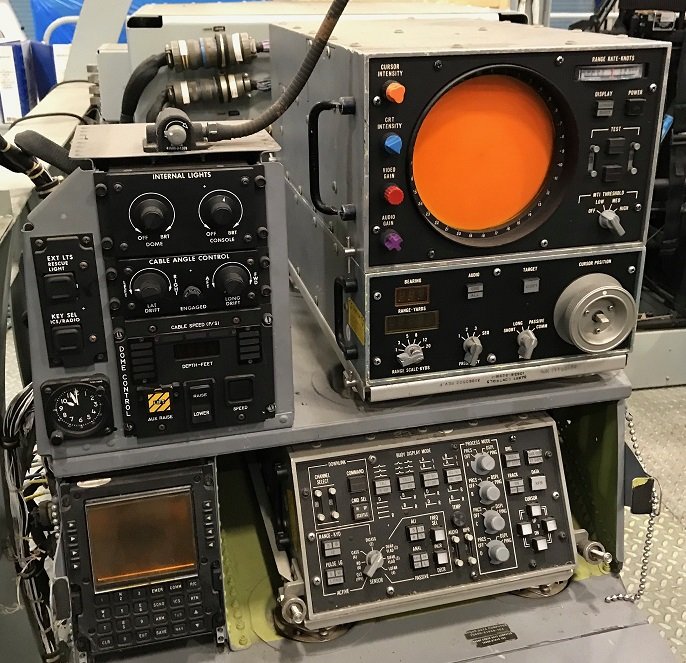
AQS-13F Dry-End Components

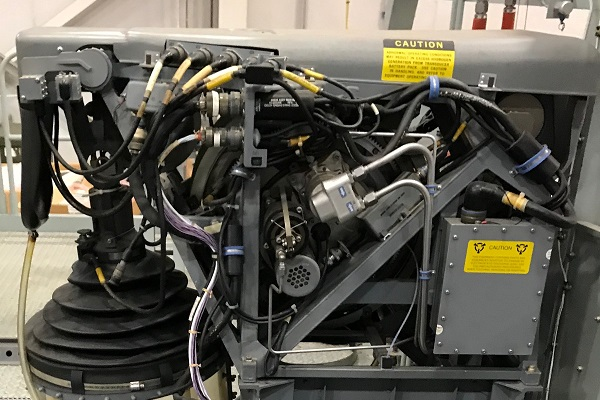
AQS-13F Reeling Machine

== Maintainability ==
=== AQM-24A ===
The AQM-21/AQM-24 and AQM-24A Sonar Test Centrals were used at U.S. Navy shore stations and aboard Aircraft Carriers to support the AQS-13 systems. These test benches provided the essential power for operation and simulated aircraft, ocean and target signals in order to test the individual components of the sonar systems.

== Manufacturer ==
The AQS-13 series systems were manufactured by a division of Bendix Corporation in Sylmar, California. This division went through multiple ownerships and name changes over the years, including ownership by Allied Signal and L-3 Communications L-3 Communications Ocean Systems. and is currently part of L-3Harris.

== Export versions ==
=== AQS-502 ===
The export version of the AQS-13B sonar used in the Royal Canadian Navy's Sikorsky CH-124 Sea King helicopter.

=== AQS-18 ===
The AQS-18 is the export version of the US Navy's AQS-13F. The original AQS-18 was developed for the German Navy from a drawing-board-only plan for an AQS-13D sonar for the US Navy. This version of the AQS-18 was initially deployed in the Westland Lynx helicopter in the early 1980s.

=== AQS-18(V) ===
AQS-18(V) Later variations were sold as the AQS-18(V) to countries around the world. Individual variations are distinct to each customer and used aboard various platforms. Earlier versions shared higher degree of commonality with the German AQS-18 and later versions more with the USN's AQS-13F. Users include the Hellenic Navy (Greece) and the Portuguese Navy.

=== AQS-18(V)-3 ===
The AQS-18 (V)-3 is one export version of the US Navy's AQS-13F helicopter-borne dipping sonar and is used by many friendly nations, including the Republic of China and the Republic of Korea. It contains many of the high-performance features of the US Navy version. In high reverberation-limited conditions the sonar system transmits a specially shaped pulse and its digital signal processor employs fast Fourier transform techniques to increase detection capabilities. A high source level provides long range search capabilities, improved figure of merit, and a high-speed reeling machine to achieve maximum depth and retrieve the sonar transducer rapidly.

=== AQS-18A ===
The AQS-18A was developed in support of the Italian Navy and later sold to various international customers, including the Turkish Navy and the Egyptian Air Force. The system shared a common "wet end" with the US Navy's AQS-13F, but had an improved "dry end" with a more modern processor, operator interface and display. These enhancements allowed for longer acoustic pulses and improved processing techniques resulting in improved tactical performance. The Turkish version was sold aboard the Agusta-Bell AB 212ASW aircraft and the Egyptian version was sold aboard the Kaman SH-2G Super Seasprite helicopter.

== Users ==
- Algerian National Navy
- Royal Australian Navy
- Brazilian Navy
- Royal Canadian Navy
- Egyptian Air Force
- German Navy
- Hellenic Navy
- Republic of Korea Navy
- Portuguese Navy
- Italian Navy
- Spanish Navy
- Republic of China Navy
- Turkish Navy
- United States Navy

== See also ==
- AN/AQS-20A – Military sonar system
- List of military electronics of the United States
