= Inverse magnetostrictive effect =

Physical phenomenon

The inverse magnetostrictive effect, magnetoelastic effect or Villari effect, after its discoverer Emilio Villari, is the change of the magnetic susceptibility of a material when subjected to a mechanical stress.

== Explanation ==
The magnetostriction $\lambda$ characterizes the shape change of a ferromagnetic material during magnetization, whereas the inverse magnetostrictive effect characterizes the change of sample magnetization $M$(for given magnetizing field strength $H$) when mechanical stresses $\sigma$ are applied to the sample.

=== Qualitative explanation of magnetoelastic effect ===
Under a given uni-axial mechanical stress $\sigma$, the flux density $B$ for a given magnetizing field strength $H$ may increase or decrease. The way in which a material responds to stresses depends on its saturation magnetostriction $\lambda_s$. For this analysis, compressive stresses $\sigma$ are considered as negative, whereas tensile stresses are positive.
According to Le Chatelier's principle:

$\left(\frac{d\lambda}{dH}\right)_{\sigma}=\left(\frac{dB}{d\sigma}\right)_{H}$

This means, that when the product $\sigma \lambda_s$ is positive, the flux density $B$ increases under stress. On the other hand, when the product $\sigma \lambda_s$ is negative, the flux density $B$ decreases under stress. This effect was confirmed experimentally.

=== Quantitative explanation of magnetoelastic effect ===
In the case of a single stress $\sigma$ acting upon a single magnetic domain, the magnetic strain energy density $E_\sigma$ can be expressed as:

$E_\sigma = \frac{3}{2} \lambda_s \sigma \sin^2(\theta)$

where $\lambda_s$ is the magnetostrictive expansion at saturation, and $\theta$ is the angle between the saturation magnetization and the stress's direction. When $\lambda_s$ and $\sigma$ are both positive (like in iron under tension), the energy is minimum for $\theta$ = 0, i.e. when tension is aligned with the saturation magnetization. Consequently, the magnetization is increased by tension.

=== Magnetoelastic effect in a single crystal ===
In fact, magnetostriction is more complex and depends on the direction of the crystal axes. In iron, the [100] axes are the directions of easy magnetization, while there is little magnetization along the [111] directions (unless the magnetization becomes close to the saturation magnetization, leading to the change of the domain orientation from [111] to [100]). This magnetic anisotropy pushed authors to define two independent longitudinal magnetostrictions $\lambda_{100}$ and $\lambda_{111}$.

- In cubic materials, the magnetostriction along any axis can be defined by a known linear combination of these two constants. For instance, the elongation along [110] is a linear combination of $\lambda_{100}$ and $\lambda_{111}$.
- Under assumptions of isotropic magnetostriction (i.e. domain magnetization is the same in any crystallographic directions), then $\lambda_{100} = \lambda_{111} = \lambda$ and the linear dependence between the elastic energy and the stress is conserved, $E_\sigma = \frac{3}{2} \lambda \sigma (\alpha_1 \gamma_1 +\alpha_2 \gamma_2 + \alpha_3 \gamma_3)^2$. Here, $\alpha_1$, $\alpha_2$ and $\alpha_3$ are the direction cosines of the domain magnetization, and $\gamma_1$, $\gamma_2$,$\gamma_3$ those of the bond directions, towards the crystallographic directions.

== Method of testing the magnetoelastic properties of magnetic materials ==
Method suitable for effective testing of magnetoelastic effect in magnetic materials should fulfill the following requirements:

- magnetic circuit of the tested sample should be closed. Open magnetic circuit causes demagnetization, which reduces magnetoelastic effect and complicates its analysis.
- distribution of stresses should be uniform. Value and direction of stresses should be known.
- there should be the possibility of making the magnetizing and sensing windings on the sample - necessary to measure magnetic hysteresis loop under mechanical stresses.

Following testing methods were developed:

- tensile stresses applied to the strip of magnetic material in the shape of a ribbon. Disadvantage: open magnetic circuit of the tested sample.
- tensile or compressive stresses applied to the frame-shaped sample. Disadvantage: only bulk materials may be tested. No stresses in the joints of sample columns.
- compressive stresses applied to the ring core in the sideways direction. Disadvantage: non-uniform stresses distribution in the core .
- tensile or compressive stresses applied axially to the ring sample. Disadvantage: stresses are perpendicular to the magnetizing field.

== Applications of magnetoelastic effect ==
Magnetoelastic effect can be used in development of force sensors. This effect was used for sensors:

- in civil engineering.
- for monitoring of large diesel engines in locomotives.
- for monitoring of ball valves.
- for biomedical monitoring.

Inverse magnetoelastic effects have to be also considered as a side effect of accidental or intentional application of mechanical stresses to the magnetic core of inductive component, e.g. fluxgates or generator/motor stators when installed with interference fits.

== See also ==
- Magnetostriction
- Magnetocrystalline anisotropy
