= Sonar =

Acoustic sensing method

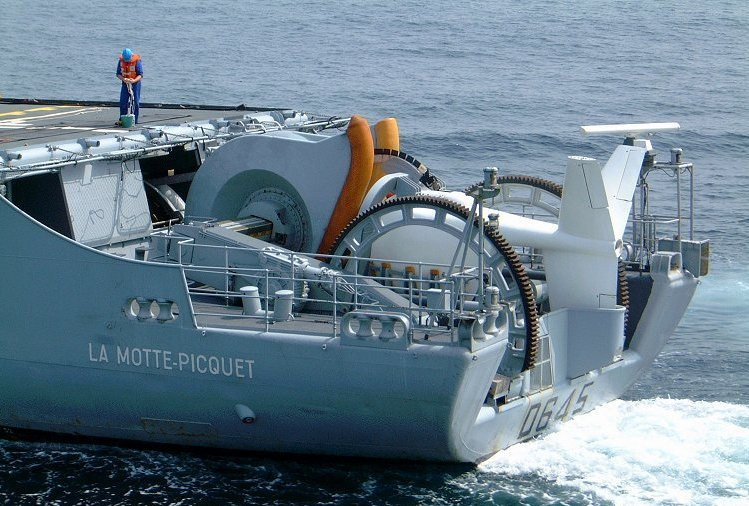
French F70 type frigates (here, La Motte-Picquet) are fitted with variable depth sonar (VDS) type DUBV43 or DUBV43C towed sonars.

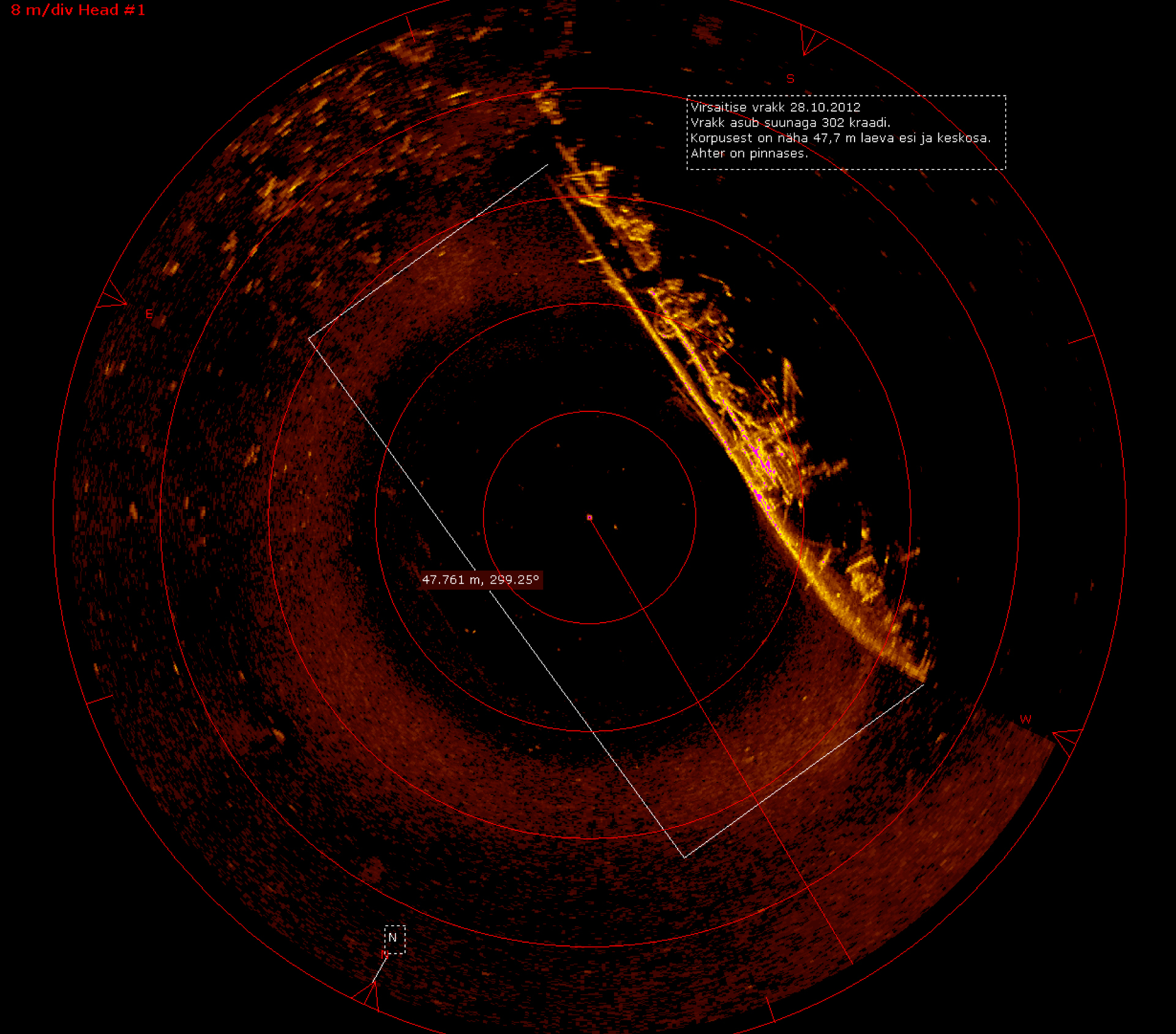
A sonar image of the Soviet Navy minesweeper T-297, formerly the Latvian Virsaitis, which was shipwrecked in December 1941 in the Gulf of Finland.

Sonar (sound navigation and ranging or sonic navigation and ranging) is a technique that uses sound propagation (usually underwater, as in submarine navigation) to navigate, measure distances (ranging), communicate with or detect objects on or under the surface of the water, such as other vessels.

"Sonar" can refer to one of two types of technology: passive sonar means listening for the sound made by vessels; active sonar means emitting pulses of sounds and listening for echoes. Sonar may be used as a means of acoustic location and of measurement of the echo characteristics of "targets" in the water. Acoustic location in air was used before the introduction of radar. Sonar may also be used for robot navigation, and sodar (an upward-looking in-air sonar) is used for atmospheric investigations. The term sonar is also used for the equipment used to generate and receive the sound. The acoustic frequencies used in sonar systems vary from very low (infrasonic) to extremely high (ultrasonic). The study of underwater sound is known as underwater acoustics or hydroacoustics.

The first recorded use of the technique was in 1490 by Leonardo da Vinci, who used a tube inserted into the water to detect vessels by ear. It was developed during World War I to counter the growing threat of submarine warfare, with an operational passive sonar system in use by 1918. Modern active sonar systems use an acoustic transducer to generate a sound wave which is reflected from target objects.

== History ==
Although some animals (dolphins, bats, some shrews, and others) have used sound for communication and object detection for millions of years, use by humans in the water was initially recorded by Leonardo da Vinci in 1490: a tube inserted into the water was said to be used to detect vessels by placing an ear to the tube.

In the late 19th century, an underwater bell was used as an ancillary to lighthouses or lightships to provide warning of hazards.

The use of sound to "echo-locate" underwater in the same way as bats use sound for aerial navigation seems to have been prompted by the Titanic disaster of 1912. The world's first patent for an underwater echo-ranging device was filed at the British Patent Office by English meteorologist Lewis Fry Richardson a month after the sinking of Titanic. A German physicist Alexander Behm obtained a patent for an echo sounder in 1913.

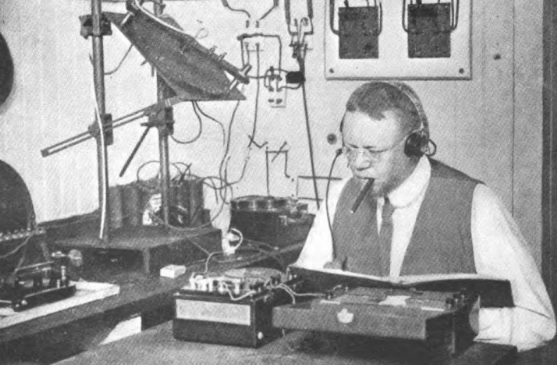
Fessenden operating underwater oscillator in 1915.

The Canadian engineer Reginald Fessenden, while working for the Submarine Signal Company in Boston, Massachusetts, built an experimental system beginning in 1912, a system later tested in Boston Harbor, and in 1914 from the U.S. Revenue Cutter Miami on the Grand Banks off Newfoundland. In that test, Fessenden demonstrated depth sounding, underwater communications (Morse code) and echo ranging, detecting an iceberg at a 2-mile (3.2 km) range. The "Fessenden oscillator", operated at about 500 Hz frequency, was unable to determine the bearing of the iceberg due to the 3-metre wavelength and the small dimension of the transducer's radiating face, less than 1/3 wavelength in diameter. In 1915, the ten Montreal-built British H-class submarines launched were equipped with Fessenden oscillators.

During World War I the need to detect submarines prompted more research into the use of sound. The British made early use of underwater listening devices called hydrophones. The French physicist Paul Langevin, working with a Russian immigrant electrical engineer Constantin Chilowsky, worked on the development of active sound devices for detecting submarines in 1915. Although piezoelectric and magnetostrictive transducers later superseded the electrostatic transducers they used, this work influenced future designs. Lightweight sound-sensitive plastic film and fibre optics have been used for hydrophones. Terfenol-D and lead magnesium niobate (PMN) have been developed for projectors.

=== ASDIC ===
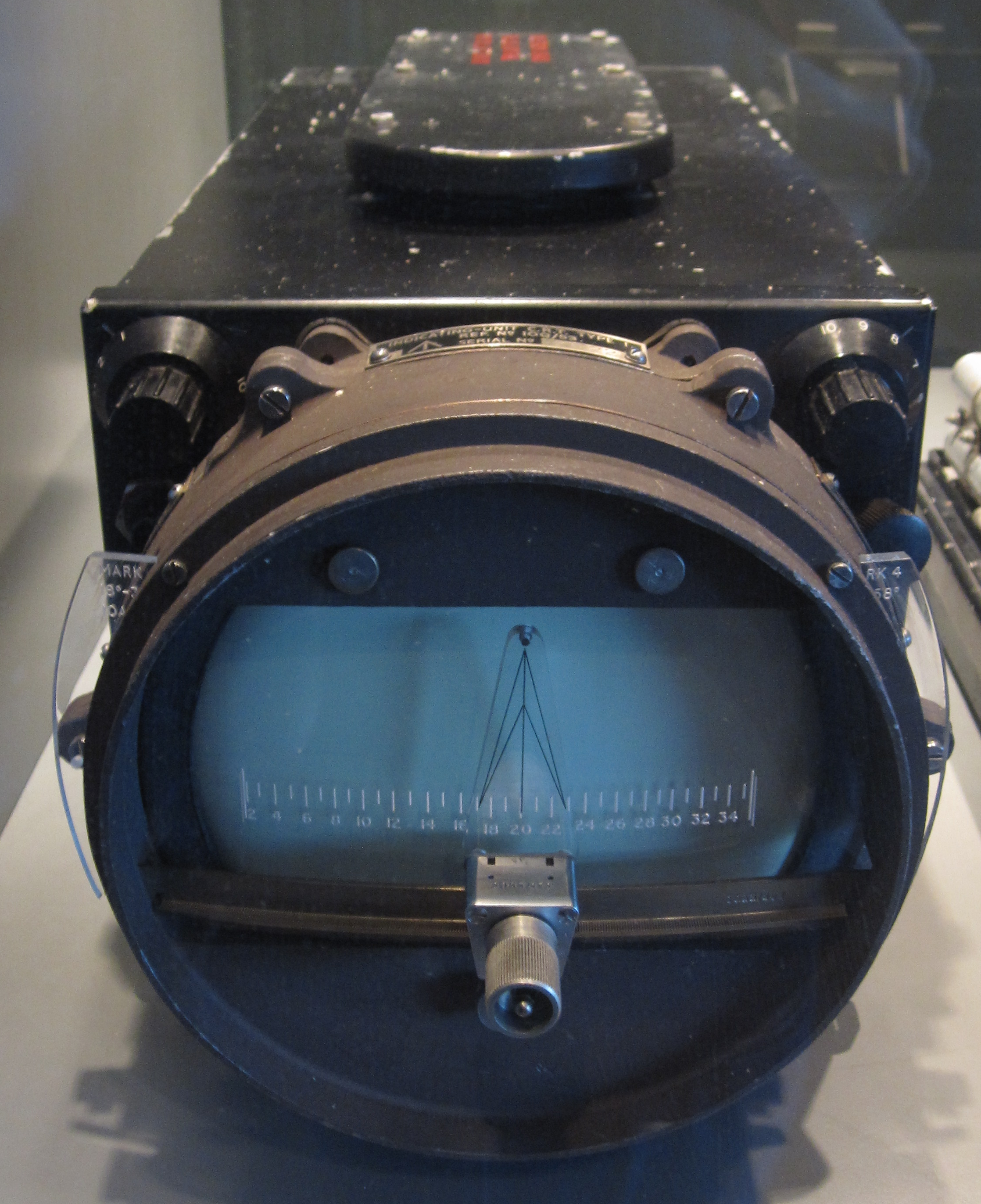
An ASDIC display unit from around 1944

In 1916, under the British Board of Invention and Research, Canadian physicist Robert William Boyle took on the active sound detection project with A. B. Wood, producing a prototype for testing in mid-1917. This work for the Anti-Submarine Division of the British Naval Staff was undertaken in utmost secrecy, and used quartz piezoelectric crystals to produce the world's first practical underwater active sound detection apparatus.

To maintain secrecy, no mention of sound experimentation or quartz was made – the word used to describe the early work ("supersonics") was changed to "ASD"ics, and the quartz material to "ASD"ivite: "ASD" for "Anti-Submarine Division", hence the British acronym ASDIC. In 1939, in response to a question from the Oxford English Dictionary, the Admiralty made up the story that it stood for "Allied Submarine Detection Investigation Committee", and this is still widely believed, though no committee bearing this name has been found in the Admiralty archives.

By 1918, Britain and France had built prototype active systems. The British tested their ASDIC on HMS Antrim in 1920 and started production in 1922. The 6th Destroyer Flotilla had ASDIC-equipped vessels in 1923. An anti-submarine school HMS Osprey and a training flotilla of four vessels were established on Portland in 1924.

By the outbreak of World War II, the Royal Navy had five sets for different surface ship classes, and others for submarines, incorporated into a complete anti-submarine system. The effectiveness of early ASDIC was hampered by the use of the depth charge as an anti-submarine weapon. This required an attacking vessel to pass over a submerged contact before dropping charges over the stern, resulting in a loss of ASDIC contact in the moments leading up to attack. The hunter was effectively firing blind, during which time a submarine commander could take evasive action. This situation was remedied with new tactics and new weapons.

The tactical improvements developed by Frederic John Walker included the creeping attack. Two anti-submarine ships were needed for this, usually sloops or corvettes. One, the directing ship tracked the target submarine on ASDIC, while the second ship, the attacking ship with her ASDIC turned off and running at 5 knots, started an attack as directed. The low speed of the approach meant the submarine could not predict when depth charges were going to be released by the attacking ship. Any evasive action was detected by the directing ship and steering orders were given to the attacking ship accordingly.

The new weapons to deal with the ASDIC blind spot were "ahead-throwing weapons", such as Hedgehogs and later Squids, which projected warheads at a target ahead of the attacker and still in ASDIC contact. These allowed a single escort to make better aimed attacks on submarines. Developments during the war resulted in British ASDIC sets that used several different beam shapes, such as the Q attachment to the Type 144 set, which was aligned at a deeper angle. The Type 147B set, which had an articulated transducer, enabled operators to cover the blind spot. Another development was the FIDO Homing Torpedo, which aimed itself at the target submarine using passive sonar.

Early in World War II (September 1940), British ASDIC technology was transferred for free to the United States. Research on ASDIC and underwater sound was expanded in the UK and in the US. Many new types of military sound detection were developed. These included sonobuoys, first developed by the British in 1944 under the codename High Tea, dipping/dunking sonar and mine-detection sonar. This work formed the basis for post-war developments related to countering the nuclear submarine.

=== SONAR ===
During the 1930s, American engineers developed their own underwater sound-detection technology, and important discoveries were made, such as the existence of thermoclines and their effects on sound waves. Americans began to use the term SONAR for their systems, coined by Frederick Hunt to be the equivalent of RADAR.

=== US Navy Underwater Sound Laboratory ===
In 1917, the US Navy acquired J. Warren Horton's services for the first time. On leave from Bell Labs, he served the government as a technical expert, first at the experimental station at Nahant, Massachusetts, and later at US Naval Headquarters in London, England. At Nahant, he applied the newly developed vacuum tube, then associated with the formative stages of the field of applied science now known as electronics, to the detection of underwater signals. As a result, the carbon button microphone, which had been used in earlier detection equipment, was replaced by the precursor of the modern hydrophone. Also during this period, he experimented with methods for towed detection. This was due to the increased sensitivity of his device. The principles are still used in modern towed sonar systems.

To meet the defense needs of Great Britain, Horton was sent to England to install in the Irish Sea bottom-mounted hydrophones connected to a shore listening post by submarine cable. While this equipment was being loaded on the cable-laying vessel, World War I ended and he returned home.

During World War II, Horton continued to develop sonar systems that could detect submarines, mines, and torpedoes. He published Fundamentals of Sonar in 1957 as chief research consultant at the US Navy Underwater Sound Laboratory. He held this position until 1959 when he became technical director, a position he held until mandatory retirement in 1963.

=== Materials and designs in the US and Japan ===
There was little progress in US sonar from 1915 to 1940. In 1940, US sonars typically consisted of a magnetostrictive transducer and an array of nickel tubes connected to a 1-foot-diameter steel plate attached back-to-back to a Rochelle salt crystal in a spherical housing. This assembly penetrated the ship hull and was manually rotated to the desired angle. The piezoelectric Rochelle salt crystal had better parameters, but the magnetostrictive unit was much more reliable.

High losses to US merchant supply shipping early in World War II led to large-scale, high-priority US research in the field, pursuing both improvements in magnetostrictive transducer parameters and Rochelle salt reliability. Ammonium dihydrogen phosphate (ADP), a superior alternative, was found as a replacement for Rochelle salt; the first application was a replacement of the 24 kHz Rochelle-salt transducers. Within nine months, Rochelle salt was obsolete. The ADP manufacturing facility grew from a few dozen personnel in early 1940 to several thousand in 1942.

One of the earliest application of ADP crystals were hydrophones for acoustic mines. The crystals were specified for low-frequency cutoff at 5 Hz, withstanding mechanical shock for deployment from aircraft from 3,000 m (10,000 ft), and the ability to survive neighbouring mine explosions. One of the key features of ADP reliability is its zero aging characteristics; the crystal keeps its parameters even over prolonged storage.

Another application was for acoustic homing torpedoes. Two pairs of directional hydrophones were mounted on the torpedo nose, in the horizontal and vertical plane; the difference signals from the pairs were used to steer the torpedo left-right and up-down. A countermeasure was developed: the targeted submarine discharged an effervescent chemical, and the torpedo went after the noisier fizzy decoy. The counter-countermeasure was a torpedo with active sonar – a transducer was added to the torpedo nose, and the microphones were listening for its reflected periodic tone bursts. The transducers comprised identical rectangular crystal plates arranged to diamond-shaped areas in staggered rows.

Passive sonar arrays for submarines were developed from ADP crystals. Several crystal assemblies were arranged in a steel tube, vacuum-filled with castor oil, and sealed. The tubes then were mounted in parallel arrays.

The standard US Navy scanning sonar at the end of World War II operated at 18 kHz, using an array of ADP crystals. Desired longer range, however, required use of lower frequencies. The required dimensions were too big for ADP crystals, so in the early 1950s magnetostrictive and barium titanate piezoelectric systems were developed, but these had problems achieving uniform impedance characteristics, and the beam pattern suffered. Barium titanate was then replaced with more stable lead zirconate titanate (PZT), and the frequency was lowered to 5 kHz.

The US fleet used this material in the AN/SQS-23 sonar for several decades. The SQS-23 sonar first used magnetostrictive nickel transducers, but these weighed several tons, and nickel was expensive and considered a critical material; piezoelectric transducers were therefore substituted. The sonar was a large array of 432 individual transducers. At first, the transducers were unreliable, showing mechanical and electrical failures and deteriorating soon after installation; they were also produced by several vendors, had different designs, and their characteristics were different enough to impair the array's performance. The policy to allow repair of individual transducers was then sacrificed, and an "expendable modular design", sealed non-repairable modules was chosen instead, eliminating the problem with seals and other extraneous mechanical parts.

The Imperial Japanese Navy at the onset of World War II used projectors based on quartz. These were big and heavy, especially if designed for lower frequencies; the one for Type 91 set, operating at 9 kHz, had a diameter of 30 inches (760 mm) and was driven by an oscillator with 5 kW of power and 7 kV of output amplitude. The Type 93 projectors consisted of solid sandwiches of quartz, assembled into spherical cast iron bodies.

The Type 93 sonars were later replaced with Type 3, which followed German design and used magnetostrictive projectors. The projectors consisted of two rectangular identical independent units in a cast-iron rectangular body about 16 by 9 inches (410 mm × 230 mm). The exposed area was half the wavelength wide and three wavelengths high. The magnetostrictive cores were made from 4 mm stampings of nickel, and later of an iron-aluminium alloy with aluminium content between 12.7% and 12.9%. The power was provided from a 2 kW at 3.8 kV, with polarization from a 20 V, 8 A DC source.

The passive hydrophones of the Imperial Japanese Navy were based on moving-coil design, Rochelle salt piezo transducers, and carbon microphones.

=== Later developments in transducers ===
Magnetostrictive transducers were pursued after World War II as an alternative to piezoelectric ones. Nickel scroll-wound ring transducers were used for high-power low-frequency operations, with size up to 13 feet (4.0 m) in diameter, probably the largest individual sonar transducers ever. The advantage of metals is their high tensile strength and low input electrical impedance, but they have electrical losses and a lower coupling coefficient than PZT, whose tensile strength can be increased by prestressing.

Other materials were also tried. Nonmetallic ferrites were promising for their low electrical conductivity, resulting in low eddy current losses. Metglas offered a high coupling coefficient, but they were inferior to PZT overall. In the 1970s, compounds of rare earths and iron were discovered with superior magnetomechanical properties, namely the Terfenol-D alloy. This made possible new designs, e.g., a hybrid magnetostrictive-piezoelectric transducer. The most recent of these improved magnetostrictive materials is Galfenol.

Other types of transducers include variable-reluctance (or moving-armature, or electromagnetic) transducers, where magnetic force acts on the surfaces of gaps, and moving coil (or electrodynamic) transducers, similar to conventional speakers; the latter are used in underwater sound calibration, due to their very low resonance frequencies and flat broadband characteristics above them.

== Active sonar ==
The principle of an active sonar

Sonar pings
Recording of active sonar pings.

Active sonar uses a sound transmitter (or projector) and a receiver. When the two are in the same place, it is monostatic operation. When the transmitter and receiver are separated, it is bistatic operation. When more transmitters (or more receivers) are used, again spatially separated, it is multistatic operation. Most sonars are used monostatically, with the same array often being used for transmission and reception. Active sonobuoy fields may be operated multistatically.

Active sonar creates a pulse of sound, often called a ping, and then listens for reflections (echo) of the pulse. This pulse of sound is generally created electronically using a sonar projector consisting of a signal generator, power amplifier and electro-acoustic transducer/array. A transducer is a device that can transmit and receive acoustic signals ("pings"). A beamformer is usually employed to concentrate the acoustic power into a beam, which may be swept to cover the required search angles.

Generally, the electro-acoustic transducers are of the Tonpilz type and their design may be optimised to achieve maximum efficiency over the widest bandwidth, in order to optimise performance of the overall system. Occasionally, the acoustic pulse may be created by other means, e.g. chemically using explosives, airguns or plasma sound sources.

To measure the distance to an object, the time from transmission of a pulse to reception is measured and converted into a range using the known speed of sound. To measure the bearing, several hydrophones are used, and the set measures the relative arrival time to each, or with an array of hydrophones, by measuring the relative amplitude in beams formed through a process called beamforming. Use of an array reduces the spatial response, so to provide wide coverage multibeam systems are used.

The target signal, if present, together with noise is then passed through forms of signal processing, which for simple sonars may be just energy measurement. It is then presented to some form of decision device that calls the output either the required signal or noise. This decision device may be an operator with headphones or a display. In more sophisticated sonars, this function may be carried out by software. Further processes may be carried out to classify the target and localise it, as well as measuring its velocity.

The pulse may be at constant frequency or a chirp of changing frequency, to allow pulse compression on reception. Simple sonars generally use the former with a filter wide enough to cover possible Doppler changes due to target movement, while more complex ones generally include the latter technique. Since digital processing became available, pulse compression has usually been implemented using digital correlation techniques. Military sonars often have multiple beams to provide all-round cover, while simple ones only cover a narrow arc, although the beam may be rotated, relatively slowly, by mechanical scanning.

Particularly when single frequency transmissions are used, the Doppler effect can be used to measure the radial speed of a target. The difference in frequency between the transmitted and received signal is measured and converted into a velocity. Since Doppler shifts can be introduced by either receiver or target motion, allowance has to be made for the radial speed of the searching platform.

One useful small sonar is similar in appearance to a waterproof flashlight. The head is pointed into the water, a button is pressed, and the device displays the distance to the target. Another variant is a "fishfinder" that shows a small display with shoals of fish. Some civilian sonars, which are not designed for stealth, approach active military sonars in capability, with three-dimensional displays of the area near the boat.

When active sonar is used to measure the distance from the transducer to the bottom, it is known as echo sounding. Similar methods may be used looking upward for wave measurement.

Active sonar is also used to measure distance through water between two sonar transducers or a combination of a hydrophone (underwater acoustic microphone) and projector (underwater acoustic speaker). When a hydrophone/transducer receives a specific interrogation signal, it responds by transmitting a specific reply signal. To measure distance, one transducer/projector transmits an interrogation signal and measures the time between this transmission and the receipt of the other transducer/hydrophone reply.

The time difference, scaled by the speed of sound through water and divided by two, is the distance between the two platforms. This technique, when used with multiple transducers/hydrophones/projectors, can calculate the relative positions of static and moving objects in water.

In combat situations, an active pulse can be detected by an enemy and will reveal a submarine's position at twice the maximum distance that the submarine can itself detect a contact and give clues as to the submarine's identity based on the characteristics of the outgoing ping. For these reasons, active sonar is not frequently used by military submarines.

A very directional, but low-efficiency, type of sonar, used by fisheries, military, and for port security, makes use of a complex nonlinear feature of water known as non-linear sonar, the virtual transducer being known as a parametric array.

=== Project Artemis ===
Project Artemis was an experimental research and development project in the late 1950s to mid 1960s to examine acoustic propagation and signal processing for a low-frequency active sonar system that might be used for ocean surveillance. A secondary objective was the examination of engineering problems of fixed active bottom systems. The receiving array was located on the slope of Plantagnet Bank off Bermuda. The active source array was deployed from the converted World War II tanker USNS Mission Capistrano. Elements of Artemis were used experimentally after the main experiment was terminated.

=== Transponder ===
This is an active sonar device that receives a specific stimulus and immediately (or with a delay) retransmits the received signal or a predetermined one. Transponders can be used to remotely activate or recover subsea equipment.

=== Performance prediction ===
A sonar target is small relative to the sphere, centred around the emitter, on which it is located. Therefore, the power of the reflected signal is very low, several orders of magnitude less than the original signal. Even if the reflected signal was of the same power, the following example (using hypothetical values) shows the problem: Suppose a sonar system is capable of emitting a 10,000 W/m^{2} signal at 1 m, and detecting a 0.001 W/m^{2} signal. At 100 m the signal will be 1 W/m^{2}, due to the inverse-square law.

If the entire signal is reflected from a 10 m^{2} target, it will be at 0.001 W/m^{2} when it reaches the emitter, i.e., just detectable. However, the original signal will remain above 0.001 W/m^{2} until 3000 m. Any 10 m^{2} target between 100 and 3000 m using a similar or better system would be able to detect the pulse, but would not be detected by the emitter. The detectors must be very sensitive to pick up the echoes. Since the original signal is much more powerful, it can be detected many times farther than twice the range of the sonar (as in the example).

Active sonar have two performance limitations: due to noise and reverberation. In general, one or the other of these will dominate, so that the two effects can be initially considered separately.

In noise-limited conditions at initial detection:

SL − 2PL + TS − (NL − AG) = DT,

where SL is the source level, PL is the propagation loss (sometimes referred to as transmission loss), TS is the target strength, NL is the noise level, AG is the array gain of the receiving array (sometimes approximated by its directivity index) and DT is the detection threshold.

In reverberation-limited conditions at initial detection (neglecting array gain):

SL − 2PL + TS = RL + DT,

where RL is the reverberation level, and the other factors are as before.

=== Hand-held sonar for use by a diver ===
- The LIMIS (limpet mine imaging sonar) is a hand-held or ROV-mounted imaging sonar for use by a diver. Its name is because it was designed for patrol divers (combat frogmen or clearance divers) to look for limpet mines in low visibility water.
- The LUIS (lensing underwater imaging system) is another imaging sonar for use by a diver.
- There is or was a small flashlight-shaped handheld sonar for divers that merely displays range.
- For the INSS (integrated navigation sonar system)

=== Upward-looking sonar ===
An upward-looking sonar (ULS) is a sonar device pointed upwards, looking towards the surface of the sea. It is used for similar purposes as downward looking sonar, but has some unique applications such as measuring sea ice thickness, roughness and concentration, or measuring air entrainment from bubble plumes during rough seas. Often it is moored on the bottom of the ocean or floats on a taut line mooring at a constant depth of perhaps 100 m. They may also be used by submarines, AUVs, and floats such as the Argo float.

== Passive sonar ==
Passive sonar listens without transmitting. It is often employed in military settings, although it is also used in science applications, e.g., detecting fish for presence/absence studies in various aquatic environments – see also passive acoustics and passive radar. In the very broadest usage, this term can encompass virtually any analytical technique involving remotely generated sound, though it is usually restricted to techniques applied in an aquatic environment.

=== Identifying sound sources ===
Passive sonar has a wide variety of techniques for identifying the source of a detected sound. For example, U.S. vessels usually operate 60 Hertz (Hz) alternating current power systems. If transformers or generators are mounted without proper vibration insulation from the hull or become flooded, the 60 Hz sound from the windings can be emitted from the submarine or ship. This can help to identify its nationality, as all European submarines and nearly every other nation's submarine have 50 Hz power systems. Intermittent sound sources (such as a wrench being dropped), called "transients," may also be detectable to passive sonar. Until fairly recently, an experienced, trained operator identified signals, but now computers may do this.

Passive sonar systems may have large sonic databases, but the sonar operator usually finally classifies the signals manually. A computer system frequently uses these databases to identify classes of ships, actions (i.e. the speed of a ship, or the type of weapon released and the most effective countermeasures to employ), and even particular ships.

=== Noise limitations ===
Passive sonar on vehicles is usually severely limited because of noise generated by the vehicle. For this reason, many submarines operate nuclear reactors that can be cooled without pumps, using silent convection, or fuel cells or batteries, which can also run silently. Vehicles' propellers are also designed and precisely machined to emit minimal noise. High-speed propellers often create tiny bubbles in the water, and this cavitation has a distinct sound.

The sonar hydrophones may be towed behind the ship or submarine in order to reduce the effect of noise generated by the watercraft itself. Towed units also combat the thermocline, as the unit may be towed above or below the thermocline.

The display of most passive sonars used to be a two-dimensional waterfall display. The horizontal direction of the display is bearing. The vertical is frequency, or sometimes time. Another display technique is to color-code frequency-time information for bearing. More recent displays are generated by computers and mimic radar-type plan position indicator displays.

=== Performance prediction ===
Unlike active sonar, only one-way propagation is involved. Because of the different signal processing used, the minimal detectable signal-to-noise ratio will be different. The equation for determining the performance of a passive sonar is

SL − PL = NL − AG + DT,

where SL is the source level, PL is the propagation loss, NL is the noise level, AG is the array gain and DT is the detection threshold. The figure of merit of a passive sonar is

FOM = SL + AG − (NL + DT).

== Performance factors ==
The detection, classification and localisation performance of a sonar depends on the environment and the receiving equipment, as well as the transmitting equipment in an active sonar or the target radiated noise in a passive sonar.

=== Sound propagation ===
Sonar operation is affected by variations in sound speed, particularly in the vertical plane. Sound travels more slowly in fresh water than in sea water, though the difference is small. The speed is determined by the water's bulk modulus and mass density. The bulk modulus is affected by temperature, dissolved impurities (usually salinity), and pressure. The density effect is small. The speed of sound (in feet per second) is approximately:

4388 + (11.25 × temperature (in °F)) + (0.0182 × depth (in feet)) + salinity (in parts per thousand).

This empirically derived approximation equation is reasonably accurate for normal temperatures, concentrations of salinity and the range of most ocean depths. Ocean temperature varies with depth, but at between 30 and 100 meters there is often a marked change, called the thermocline, dividing the warmer surface water from the cold, still waters that make up the rest of the ocean. This can frustrate sonar, because a sound originating on one side of the thermocline tends to be bent, or refracted, through the thermocline.

The thermocline may be present in shallower coastal waters. Wave action will often mix the water column and eliminate the thermocline. Water pressure also affects sound propagation: higher pressure increases the sound speed, which causes the sound waves to refract away from the area of higher sound speed. The mathematical model of refraction is called Snell's law.

If the sound source is deep and the conditions are right, propagation may occur in the 'deep sound channel'. This provides extremely low propagation loss to a receiver in the channel. This is because of sound trapping in the channel with no losses at the boundaries. Similar propagation can occur in the 'surface duct' under suitable conditions. In this case, there are reflection losses at the surface.

In shallow water, propagation is generally by repeated reflection at the surface and bottom, where considerable losses can occur.

Sound propagation is affected by absorption in the water itself as well as at the surface and bottom. This absorption depends upon frequency, with several different mechanisms in seawater. Long-range sonar uses low frequencies to minimise absorption effects.

The sea contains many sources of noise that interfere with the desired target echo or signature. The main noise sources are waves and shipping. The motion of the receiver through the water can also cause speed-dependent low-frequency noise.

=== Scattering ===
When active sonar is used, scattering occurs from small objects in the sea as well as from the bottom and surface. This can be a major source of interference. This acoustic scattering is analogous to the scattering of the light from a car's headlights in fog: a high-intensity pencil beam will penetrate the fog to some extent, but broader-beam headlights emit much light in unwanted directions, much of which is scattered back to the observer, overwhelming that reflected from the target ("white-out"). For analogous reasons active sonar needs to transmit in a narrow beam to minimize scattering.

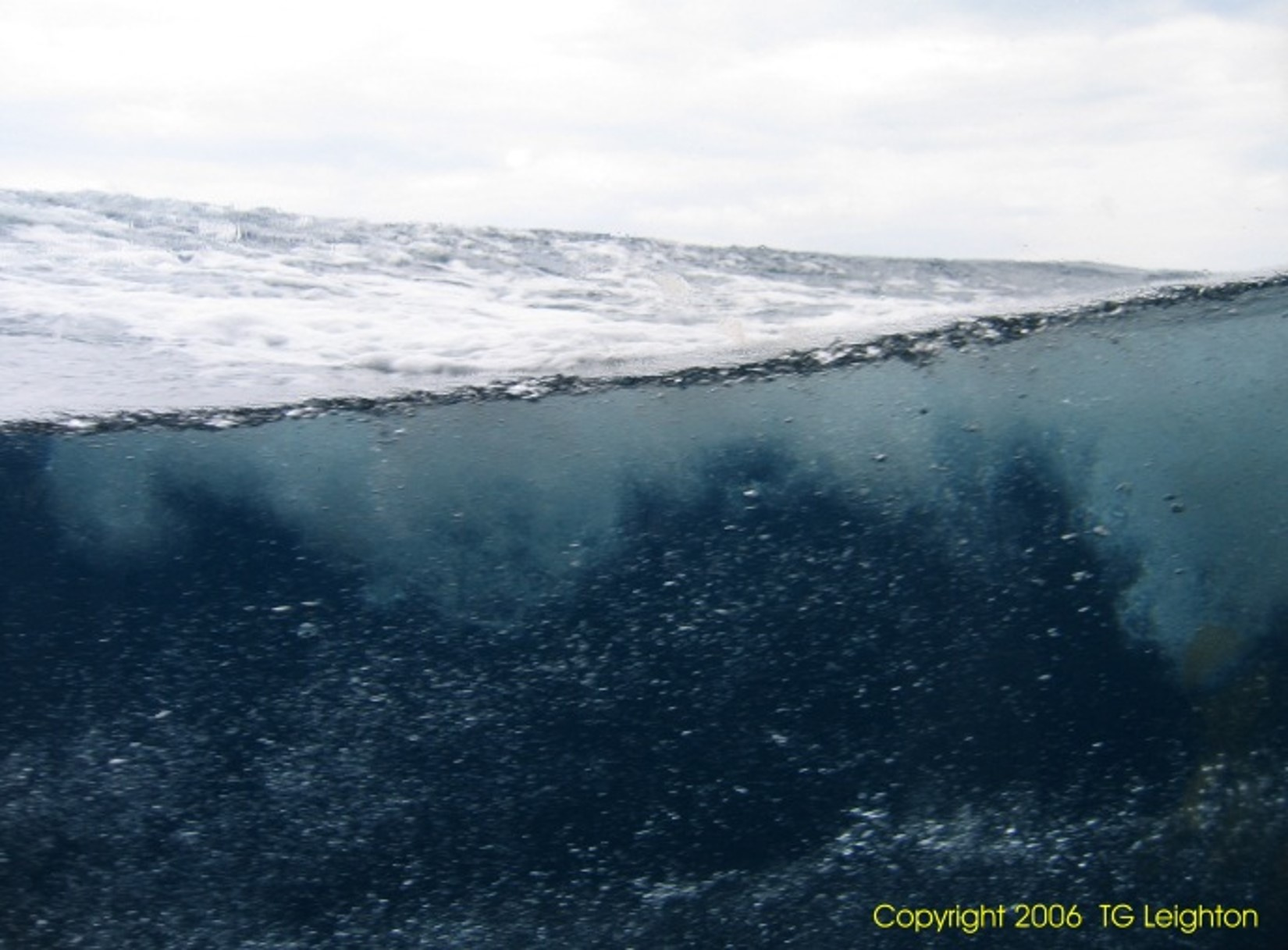
Bubble clouds shown under the sea. From ref.

The scattering of sonar from objects (mines, pipelines, zooplankton, geological features, fish etc.) is how active sonar detects them, but this ability can be masked by strong scattering from false targets, or 'clutter'. Where they occur (under breaking waves; in ship wakes; in gas emitted from seabed seeps and leaks etc.), gas bubbles are powerful sources of clutter, and can readily hide targets. TWIPS (Twin Inverted Pulse Sonar) is currently the only sonar that can overcome this clutter problem.

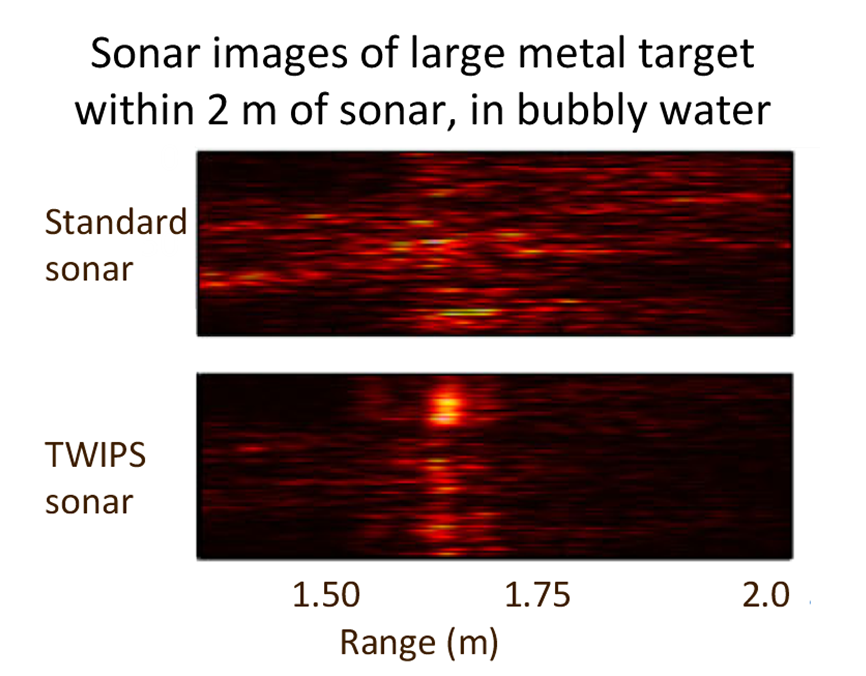
Comparison of Standard Sonar and TWIPS in finding a target in bubbly water. Adapted from ref.

This is important as many recent conflicts have occurred in coastal waters, and the inability to detect whether mines are present or not present hazards and delays to military vessels, and also to aid convoys and merchant shipping trying to support the region long after the conflict has ceased.

=== Target characteristics ===
The sound reflection characteristics of the target of an active sonar, such as a submarine, are known as its target strength. A complication is that echoes are also obtained from other objects in the sea such as whales, wakes, schools of fish and rocks.

Passive sonar detects the target's radiated noise characteristics. The radiated spectrum comprises a continuous spectrum of noise with peaks at certain frequencies which can be used for classification.

=== Countermeasures ===
Active (powered) countermeasures may be launched by a vessel under attack to raise the noise level, provide a large false target, and obscure the signature of the vessel itself.

Passive (i.e., non-powered) countermeasures include:

- Mounting noise-generating devices on isolating devices.
- Sound-absorbent coatings on the hulls of submarines, for example anechoic tiles.

== Military applications ==
Modern naval warfare makes extensive use of both passive and active sonar from water-borne vessels, aircraft and fixed installations. Although active sonar was used by surface craft in World War II, submarines avoided the use of active sonar due to the potential for revealing their presence and position to enemy forces. However, the advent of modern signal-processing enabled the use of passive sonar as a primary means for search and detection operations. In 1987 a division of Japanese company Toshiba reportedly sold machinery to the Soviet Union that allowed their submarine propeller blades to be milled so that they became radically quieter, making the newer generation of submarines more difficult to detect.

The use of active sonar by a submarine to determine bearing is extremely rare and will not necessarily give high-quality bearing or range information to the submarine's fire control team. However, use of active sonar on surface ships is very common and is used by submarines when the tactical situation dictates that it is more important to determine the position of a hostile submarine than conceal their own position. With surface ships, it might be assumed that the threat is already tracking the ship with satellite data, as any vessel around the emitting sonar will detect the emission. Having heard the signal, it is easy to identify the sonar equipment used (usually with its frequency) and its position (with the sound wave's energy). Active sonar is similar to radar in that, while it allows detection of targets at a certain range, it also enables the emitter to be detected at a far greater range, which is undesirable.

Since active sonar reveals the presence and position of the operator, and does not allow exact classification of targets, it is used by fast platforms (planes, helicopters) and by noisy platforms (most surface ships) but rarely by submarines. When active sonar is used by surface ships or submarines, it is typically activated very briefly at intermittent periods to minimize the risk of detection. Consequently, active sonar is normally considered a backup to passive sonar. In aircraft, active sonar is used in the form of disposable sonobuoys that are dropped in the aircraft's patrol area or in the vicinity of possible enemy sonar contacts.

Passive sonar has several advantages, most importantly that it is silent. If the target's radiated noise level is high enough, it can have a greater range than active sonar and allows the target to be identified. Since any motorized object makes some noise, it may in principle be detected, depending on the level of noise emitted and the ambient noise level in the area, as well as the technology used. To simplify, passive sonar "sees" around the ship using it. On a submarine, nose-mounted passive sonar detects in directions of about 270°, centered on the ship's alignment, the hull-mounted array of about 160° on each side, and the towed array of a full 360°. The invisible areas are due to the ship's own interference.

Once a signal is detected in a certain direction (which means that something makes sound in that direction; this is called broadband detection), it is possible to zoom in and analyze the signal received (narrowband analysis). This is generally done using a Fourier transform to show the different frequencies making up the sound. Since every engine makes a specific sound, it is straightforward to identify the object. Databases of unique engine sounds are part of what is known as acoustic intelligence or ACINT.

Another use of passive sonar is to determine the target's trajectory. This process is called target motion analysis (TMA), and the resultant "solution" is the target's range, course, and speed. TMA is done by marking from which direction the sound comes at different times, and comparing the motion with that of the operator's own ship. Changes in relative motion are analyzed using standard geometrical techniques along with some assumptions about limiting cases.

Passive sonar is stealthy. It requires high-tech electronic components. It is generally deployed on advanced ships in the form of arrays to enhance detection. Surface ships and submarines use it. It is also used by airplanes and helicopters, mostly to a "surprise effect", since submarines can hide under thermal layers. If a submarine's commander believes he is alone, he may bring his boat closer to the surface and be easier to detect, or go deeper and faster, and thus make more sound.

Examples of sonar applications in military use are given below. Many of the civil uses given in the following section may also be applicable to naval use.

=== Anti-submarine warfare ===
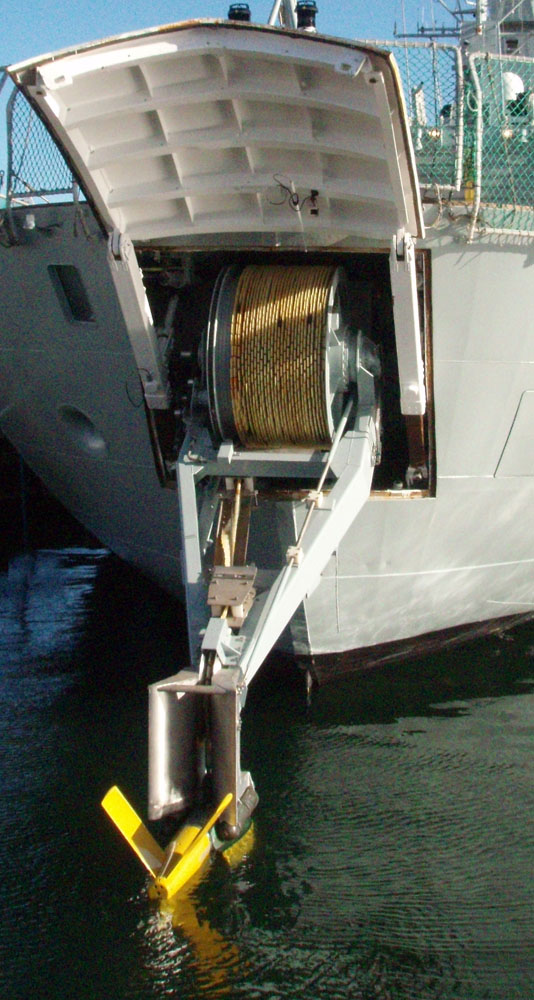
Variable depth sonar and its winch

Until recently, ship sonars were usually made with hull-mounted arrays, either amidships or at the bow. It was soon found after their initial use that a means of reducing flow noise was required. The first were made of canvas on a framework, then steel ones were used. Now domes are usually made of reinforced plastic or pressurized rubber. Such sonars are primarily active in operation. An example of a conventional hull-mounted sonar is the SQS-56.

Because of the problems of ship noise, towed sonars are also used. These have the advantage of being able to be placed deeper in the water, but have limitations on their use in shallow water. These are called towed arrays (linear) or variable depth sonars (VDS) with 2/3D arrays. A problem is that the winches required to deploy/recover them are large and expensive. VDS sets are primarily active in operation, while towed arrays are passive.

An example of a modern active-passive ship-towed sonar is Sonar 2087 made by Thales Underwater Systems.

=== Torpedoes ===
Modern torpedoes are generally fitted with an active/passive sonar. This may be used to home directly on the target, but wake homing torpedoes are also used. An early example of an acoustic homer was the Mark 37 torpedo.

Torpedo countermeasures can be towed or free. An early example was the German Sieglinde device, while the Bold was a chemical device. A widely used US device was the towed AN/SLQ-25 Nixie, while the mobile submarine simulator (MOSS) was a free device. A modern alternative to the Nixie system is the UK Royal Navy S2170 Surface Ship Torpedo Defence system.

=== Mines ===
Mines may be fitted with a sonar to detect, localize and recognize the required target. An example is the CAPTOR mine.

=== Mine countermeasures ===
Mine countermeasure (MCM) sonar, sometimes called "mine and obstacle avoidance sonar (MOAS)", is a specialized type of sonar used for detecting small objects. Most MCM sonars are hull mounted but a few types are VDS designs. An example of a hull-mounted MCM sonar is the Type 2193 while the SQQ-32 mine-hunting sonar and Type 2093 systems are VDS designs.

=== Submarine navigation ===
Submarines rely on sonar to a greater extent than surface ships as they cannot use radar in water. The sonar arrays may be hull mounted or towed. Information fitted on typical fits is given in Oyashio-class submarine and Swiftsure-class submarine.

=== Aircraft ===
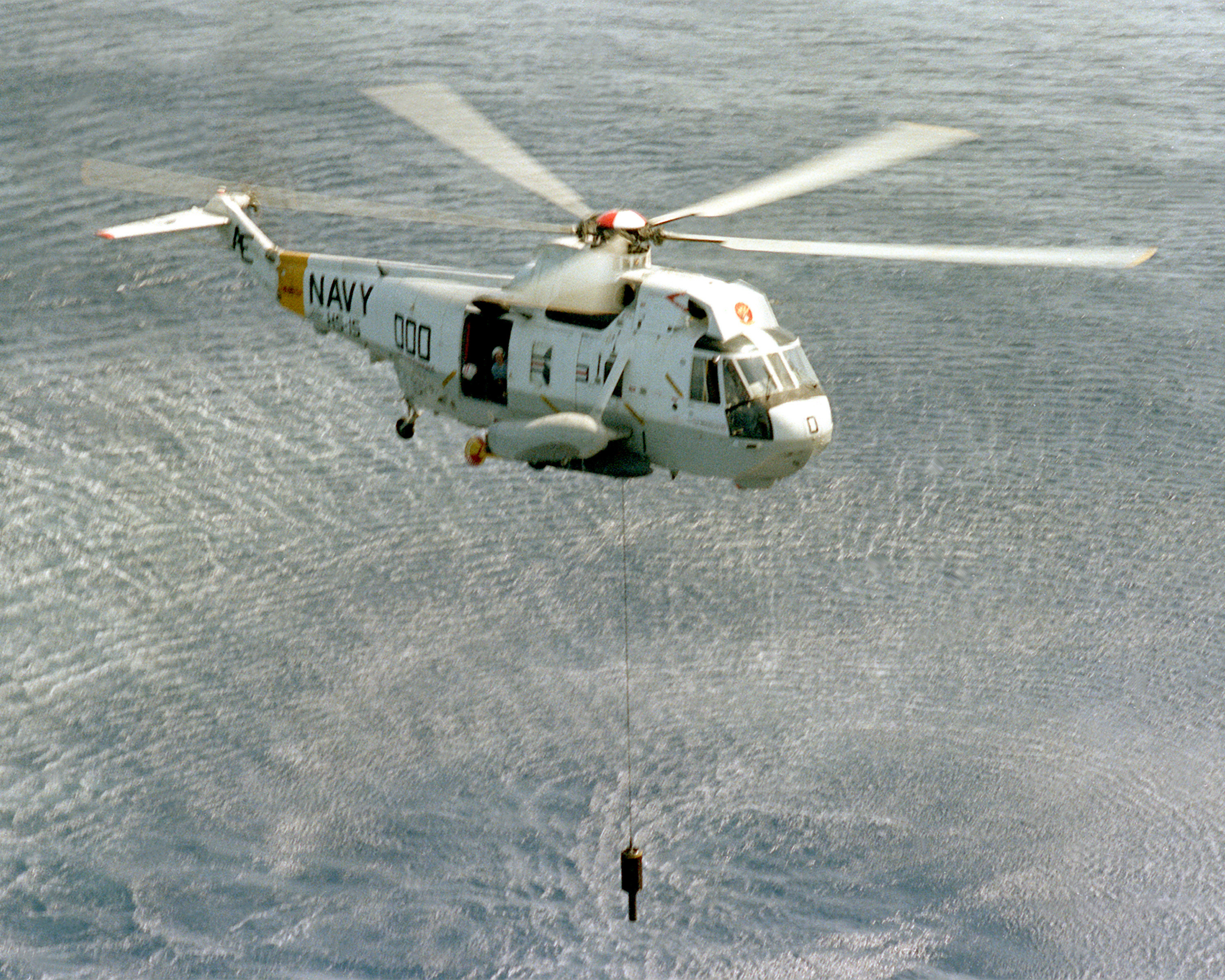
AN/AQS-13 dipping sonar deployed from an H-3 Sea King

Helicopters can be used for anti-submarine warfare by deploying fields of active-passive sonobuoys or can operate dipping sonar, such as the AQS-13. Fixed-wing aircraft can also deploy sonobuoys and have greater endurance and capacity to deploy them. Processing from the sonobuoys or dipping sonar can be on the aircraft or on a ship. Dipping sonar has the advantage of being deployable to depths appropriate to daily conditions. Helicopters have also been used for mine countermeasure missions using towed sonars such as the AQS-20A.

=== Underwater communications ===
Dedicated sonars can be fitted to ships and submarines for underwater communication.

=== Ocean surveillance ===
The United States began a system of passive, fixed ocean surveillance systems in 1950 with the classified name Sound Surveillance System (SOSUS) with American Telephone and Telegraph Company (AT&T), with its Bell Laboratories research and Western Electric manufacturing entities being contracted for development and installation. The systems exploited the SOFAR channel, also known as the deep sound channel, where a sound speed minimum creates a waveguide in which low-frequency sound travels thousands of miles.

Analysis was based on an AT&T sound spectrograph, which converted sound into a visual spectrogram representing a time–frequency analysis of sound that was developed for speech analysis and modified to analyze low-frequency underwater sounds. That process was Low Frequency Analysis and Recording and the equipment was termed the Low Frequency Analyzer and Recorder, both with the acronym LOFAR. LOFAR research was termed Jezebel and led to usage in air and surface systems, particularly sonobuoys using the process and sometimes using "Jezebel" in their name. The proposed system offered such promise of long-range submarine detection that the Navy ordered immediate moves for implementation.

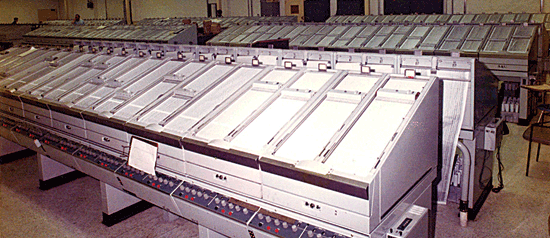
Lofargram writers, one for each array beam, on a NAVFAC watch floor

Between installation of a test array followed by a full-scale, forty-element, prototype operational array in 1951 and 1958, systems were installed in the Atlantic and then the Pacific under the unclassified name Project Caesar. The original systems were terminated at classified shore stations designated Naval Facility (NAVFAC) explained as engaging in "ocean research" to cover their classified mission. The system was upgraded multiple times with more advanced cable, allowing the arrays to be installed in ocean basins and upgraded processing.

The shore stations were eliminated in a process of consolidation and rerouting the arrays to central processing centers into the 1990s. In 1985, with new mobile arrays and other systems becoming operational, the collective system name was changed to Integrated Undersea Surveillance System (IUSS). In 1991, the mission of the system was declassified. The year before, IUSS insignia were authorized for wear. Access was granted to some systems for scientific research.

A similar system is believed to have been operated by the Soviet Union.

=== Underwater security ===
Sonar can be used to detect frogmen and other scuba divers. This can be applicable around ships or at entrances to ports. Active sonar can also be used as a deterrent and/or disablement mechanism. One such device is the Cerberus system.

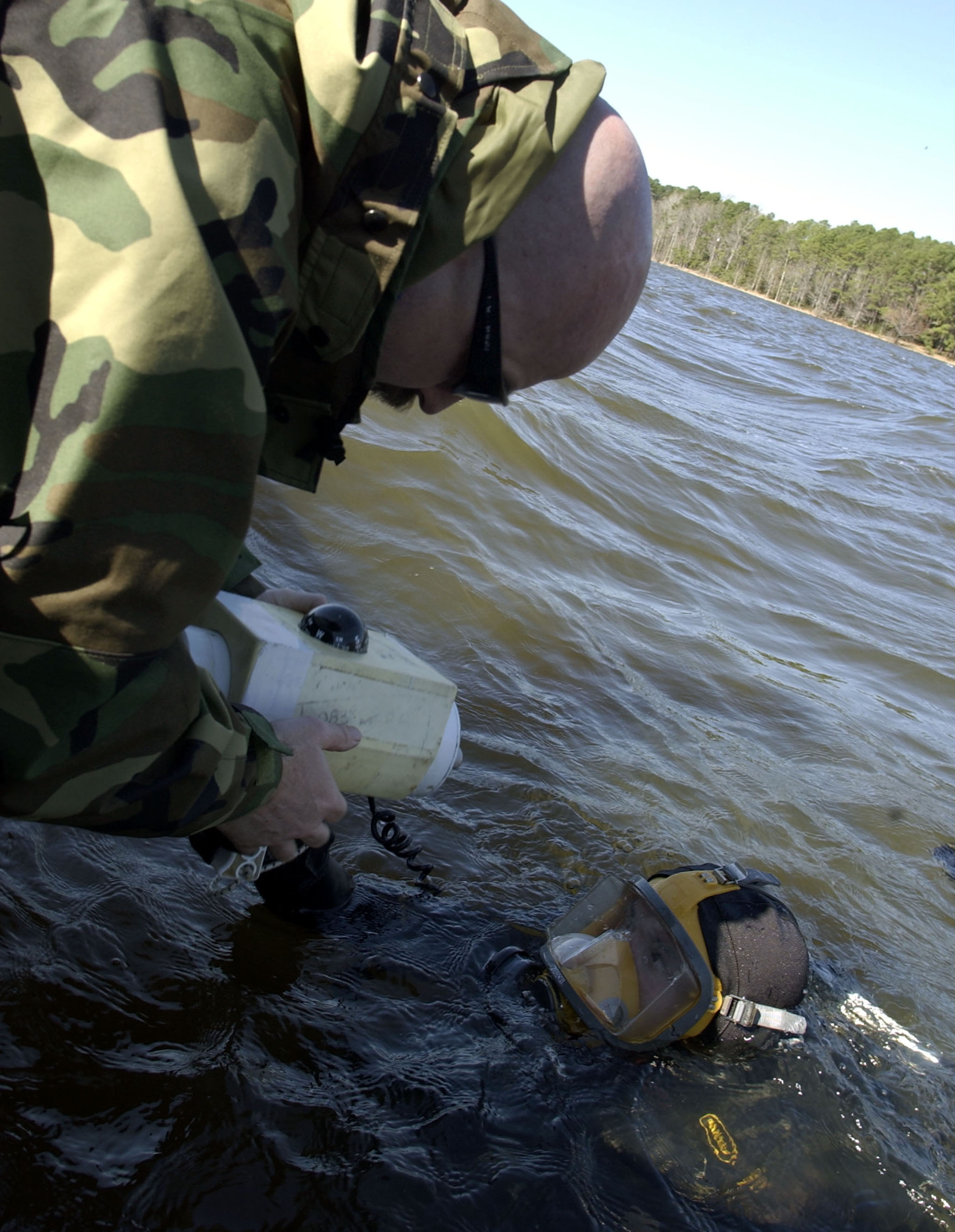
AN/PQS-2A handheld sonar, shown with detachable flotation collar and magnetic compass

=== Hand-held sonar ===
Limpet mine imaging sonar (LIMIS) is a hand-held or ROV-mounted imaging sonar designed for patrol divers (combat frogmen or clearance divers) to look for limpet mines in low visibility water.

The LUIS is another imaging sonar for use by a diver.

Integrated navigation sonar system (INSS) is a small flashlight-shaped handheld sonar for divers that displays range.

=== Intercept sonar ===
This is a sonar designed to detect and locate transmissions from hostile active sonars. An example of this is the Type 2082 fitted on the British Vanguard-class submarines.

== Civilian applications ==
=== Fisheries ===
Fishing is an important industry that is seeing growing demand, but world catch tonnage is falling as a result of serious resource problems. The industry faces a future of continuing worldwide consolidation until a point of sustainability can be reached. However, the consolidation of the fishing fleets is driving increased demand for sophisticated fish-finding electronics such as sensors, sounders and sonars. Historically, fishermen have used many different techniques to find and harvest fish. However, acoustic technology has been one of the most important driving forces behind the development of the modern commercial fisheries.

Sound waves travel differently through fish than through water because a fish's air-filled swim bladder has a different density than seawater. This density difference allows the detection of schools of fish by using reflected sound. Acoustic technology is especially well suited for underwater applications since sound travels farther and faster underwater than in air. Today, commercial fishing vessels rely almost completely on acoustic sonar and sounders to detect fish. Fishermen also use active sonar and echo sounder technology to determine water depth, bottom contour, and bottom composition.

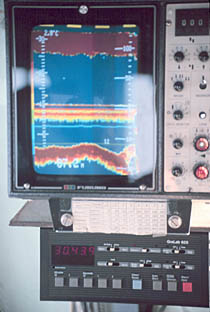
Cabin display of a fish finder sonar

Companies such as eSonar, Raymarine, Marport Canada, Wesmar, Furuno, Krupp, and Simrad make a variety of sonar and acoustic instruments for the deep sea commercial fishing industry. For example, net sensors take various underwater measurements and transmit the information back to a receiver on board a vessel. Each sensor is equipped with one or more acoustic transducers depending on its specific function. Data is transmitted from the sensors using wireless acoustic telemetry and is received by a hull-mounted hydrophone. The analog signals are decoded and converted by a digital acoustic receiver into data, which is transmitted to a bridge computer for graphical display on a high-resolution monitor.

=== Echo sounding ===
Echo sounding is a process used to determine the depth of water beneath ships and boats. A type of active sonar, echo sounding is the transmission of an acoustic pulse directly downwards to the seabed, measuring the time between transmission and echo return, after having hit the bottom and bouncing back to its ship of origin. The acoustic pulse is emitted by a transducer which receives the return echo as well. The depth measurement is calculated by multiplying the speed of sound in water (averaging 1,500 meters per second) by the time between emission and echo return.

The value of underwater acoustics to the fishing industry has led to the development of other acoustic instruments that operate in a similar fashion to echo-sounders but, because their function is slightly different from the initial model of the echo-sounder, have been given different terms.

=== Net location ===
The net sounder is an echo sounder with a transducer mounted on the headline of the net rather than on the bottom of the vessel. Nevertheless, to accommodate the distance from the transducer to the display unit, which is much greater than in a normal echo-sounder, several refinements have to be made. Two main types are available. The first is the cable type in which the signals are sent along a cable. In this case, there has to be the provision of a cable drum on which to haul, shoot and stow the cable during the different phases of the operation. The second type is the cable-less net-sounder – such as Marport's Trawl Explorer – in which the signals are sent acoustically between the net and hull-mounted receiver-hydrophone on the vessel. In this case, no cable drum is required but sophisticated electronics are needed at the transducer and receiver.

The display on a net sounder shows the distance of the net from the bottom (or the surface), rather than the depth of water as with the echo-sounder's hull-mounted transducer. Fixed to the headline of the net, the footrope can usually be seen, which gives an indication of the net's performance. Any fish passing into the net can also be seen, allowing fine adjustments to be made to catch the most fish possible. In other fisheries, where the amount of fish in the net is important, catch sensor transducers are mounted at various positions on the cod-end of the net. As the cod-end fills up, these catch sensor transducers are triggered one by one and this information is transmitted acoustically to display monitors on the bridge of the vessel. The skipper can then decide when to haul the net.

Modern versions of the net sounder, using multiple element transducers, function more like a sonar than an echo sounder and show slices of the area in front of the net and not merely the vertical view that the initial net sounders used.

The sonar is an echo-sounder with a directional capability that can show fish or other objects around the vessel.

=== ROV and UUV ===
Small sonars have been fitted to remotely operated vehicles (ROVs) and unmanned underwater vehicles (UUVs) to allow their operation in murky conditions. These sonars are used for looking ahead of the vehicle. The AN/BLQ-11 Long-Term Mine Reconnaissance System is a UUV for MCM purposes.

=== Vehicle location ===
Sonars which act as beacons are fitted to aircraft to allow their location in the event of a crash in the sea. Short and long-baseline sonars may be used for caring out the location, such as LBL.

=== Prosthesis for the visually impaired ===
In 2013, an inventor in the United States unveiled a "spider-sense" bodysuit, equipped with ultrasonic sensors and haptic feedback systems, which alerts the wearer of incoming threats, allowing them to respond to attackers even when blindfolded.

== Scientific applications ==
=== Biomass estimation ===
Detection of fish and other marine and aquatic life, and estimation of their individual sizes or total biomass using active sonar techniques. Sound pulses reflect off any object that has a different density than the surrounding medium. This includes fish, or more specifically, the air-filled swim bladder in fish. These echoes provide information on fish size, location, abundance and behavior. This is especially effective for fish swim bladders (e.g. herring, cod, and pollock), and less useful for fish without them (e.g. sharks, mackerel, and flounder). Data from the watercolumn is usually processed differently than seafloor or object detection data, this data type can be processed with specialized software.

=== Wave measurement ===
An upward-looking echo sounder mounted on the bottom or on a platform may be used to make measurements of wave height and period. From these, statistics of the surface conditions at a location can be derived.

=== Water velocity measurement ===
Special short-range sonars have been developed to allow measurements of water velocity.

=== Bottom type assessment ===
Sonars have been developed that can be used to characterise the sea bottom into, for example, mud, sand, and gravel. Relatively simple sonars such as echo sounders can be promoted to seafloor classification systems via add-on modules, converting echo parameters into sediment type. Different algorithms exist, but they are all based on changes in the energy or shape of the reflected sounder pings. Advanced substrate classification analysis can be achieved using calibrated (scientific) echosounders and parametric or fuzzy-logic analysis of the acoustic data.

=== Bathymetric mapping ===
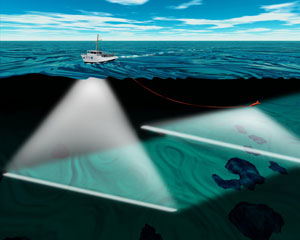
Graphic depicting hydrographic survey ship conducting multibeam and side-scan sonar operations

Side-scan sonars can be used to derive maps of seafloor topography (bathymetry) by moving the sonar across it just above the bottom. Low-frequency sonars such as GLORIA have been used for continental shelf-wide surveys, while high-frequency sonars are used for more detailed surveys of smaller areas.

Hull-mounted multibeam echosounders on large surface vessels produce swathes of bathymetric data in near real time. One example, the General Instrument "Seabeam" system, uses a projector array along the keel to ensonify the bottom with a fan beam. Signals from a hydrophone array mounted athwartships are processed to synthesize multiple virtual fan beams crossing the projector beam at right angles.

=== Sonar imaging ===
Creating two and three-dimensional images using sonar data.

=== Sub-bottom profiling ===
Powerful low-frequency echo-sounders have been developed for providing profiles of the upper layers of the ocean bottom. One of the most recent devices is Innomar's SES-2000 quattro multi-transducer parametric SBP, used, for example, in Puck Bay for underwater archaeological purposes.

=== Gas leak detection from the seabed ===
Gas bubbles can leak from the seabed, or close to it, from multiple sources. These can be detected by both passive and active sonar (shown in schematic figure by yellow and red systems respectively).

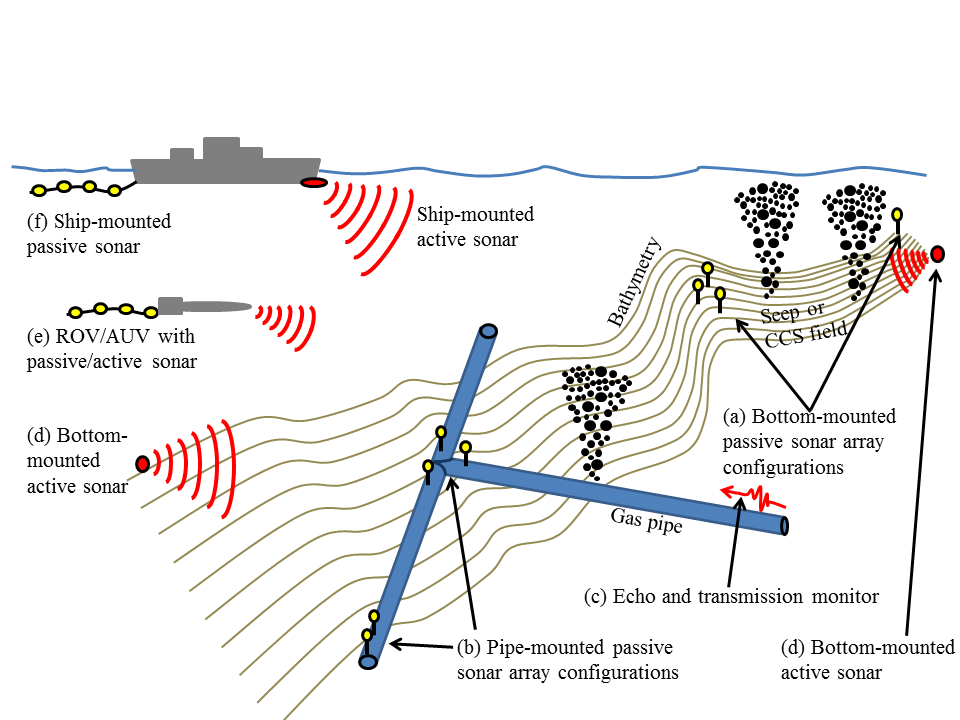
Active (red) and passive (yellow) sonar detection of bubbles from seabed (natural seeps and CCSF leaks) and gas pipelines, taken from ref.

Natural seeps of methane and carbon dioxide occur. Gas pipelines can leak, and it is important to be able to detect whether leakage occurs from Carbon Capture and Storage Facilities (CCSFs; e.g. depleted oil wells into which extracted atmospheric carbon is stored). Quantification of the amount of gas leaking is difficult, and although estimates can be made use active and passive sonar, it is important to question their accuracy because of the assumptions inherent in making such estimations from sonar data.

=== Synthetic aperture sonar ===
Various synthetic aperture sonars have been built in the laboratory and some have entered use in mine-hunting and search systems. An explanation of their operation is given in synthetic aperture sonar.

=== Parametric sonar ===
Parametric sources use the non-linearity of water to generate the difference frequency between two high frequencies. A virtual end-fire array is formed. Such a projector has advantages of broad bandwidth, narrow beamwidth, and when fully developed and carefully measured it has no obvious sidelobes: see Parametric array. Its major disadvantage is very low efficiency of only a few percent. P.J. Westervelt summarizes the trends involved.

=== Sonar in extraterrestrial contexts ===
The use of both active and passive sonar has been proposed for various extraterrestrial environments. One example is Titan, where active sonar could be used to determine the depth of its hydrocarbon seas, and passive sonar could be used to detect methanefalls.

Proposals that do not take proper account of the difference between terrestrial and extraterrestrial environments could lead to erroneous measurements.

== Ecological impact ==
=== Effect on marine mammals ===
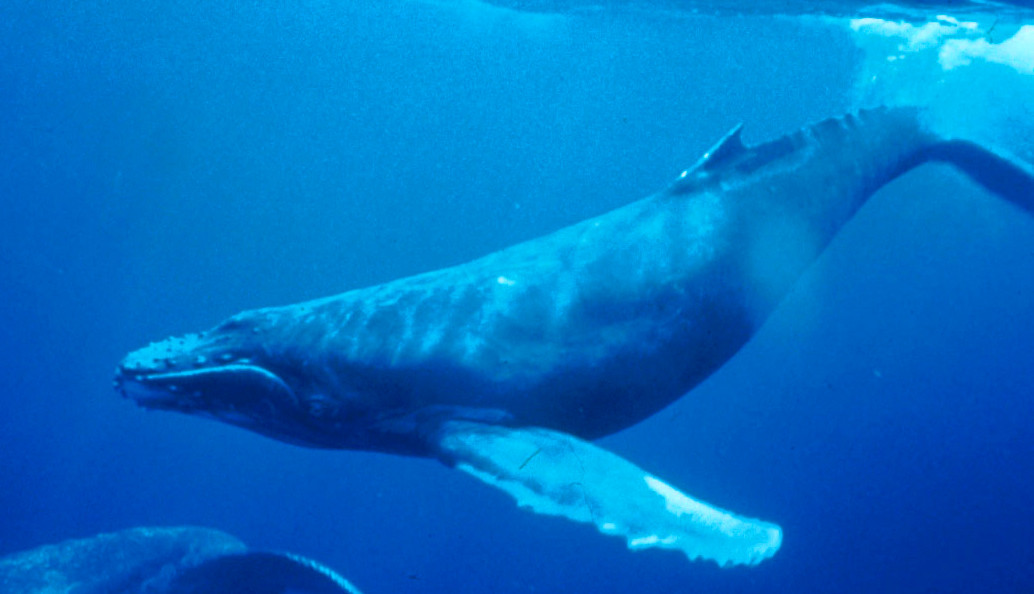
A humpback whale

Research has shown that use of active sonar can lead to mass strandings of marine mammals. Beaked whales, the most common casualty of the strandings, have been shown to be highly sensitive to mid-frequency active sonar. Other marine mammals such as the blue whale also flee from the source of the sonar, while naval activity was suggested to be the most probable cause of a mass stranding of dolphins.

The US Navy, which part-funded some of the studies, said that the findings only showed behavioural responses to sonar, not actual harm, but they "will evaluate the effectiveness of [their] marine mammal protective measures in light of new research findings". A 2008 US Supreme Court ruling on the use of sonar by the US Navy noted that there had been no cases where sonar had been conclusively shown to have harmed or killed a marine mammal.

Some marine animals, such as whales and dolphins, use echolocation systems, sometimes called biosonar to locate predators and prey. Research on the effects of sonar on blue whales in the Southern California Bight shows that mid-frequency sonar use disrupts the whales' feeding behavior. This indicates that sonar-induced disruption of feeding and displacement from high-quality prey patches could have significant and previously undocumented impacts on baleen whale foraging ecology, individual fitness and population health.

A review of evidence on the mass strandings of beaked whales linked to naval exercises where sonar was used was published in 2019. It concluded that the effects of mid-frequency active sonar are strongest on Cuvier's beaked whales but vary among individuals or populations. The review suggested the strength of response of individual animals may depend on whether they had prior exposure to sonar, and that symptoms of decompression sickness have been found in stranded whales that may be a result of such response to sonar. It noted that in the Canary Islands, where multiple strandings had been previously reported, no more mass strandings had occurred once naval exercises during which sonar was used were banned in the area, and recommended that the ban be extended to other areas where mass strandings continue to occur.

=== Effect on fish ===
Low-frequency sonar can create a small temporary shift in the hearing threshold of some fish. (Note: Halvorsen et al. (2013) conclude that observed effects were "typically small even though the fish were near the sonar and remained there for the full duration of three test signals".)

== Frequencies and resolutions ==
The frequencies of sonars range from infrasonic to above a megahertz. Generally, the lower frequencies have longer range, while the higher frequencies offer better resolution and smaller size for a given directionality.

To achieve reasonable directionality, frequencies below 1 kHz generally require large size, usually achieved as towed arrays.

Low-frequency sonars are loosely defined as 1–5 kHz, albeit some navies regard 5–7 kHz also as low frequency. Medium frequency is defined as 5–15 kHz. Another style of division considers low frequency to be under 1 kHz, and medium frequency to be between 1–10 kHz.

American World War II era sonars operated at a relatively high frequency of 20–30 kHz, to achieve directionality with reasonably small transducers, with a typical maximum operational range of 2,500 yd. Postwar sonars used lower frequencies to achieve longer range; e.g., SQS-4 operated at 10 kHz with range up to 5,000 yd. SQS-26 and SQS-53 operated at 3 kHz with range up to 20,000 yd; their domes had the approximate size of a 60-ft personnel boat, an upper size limit for conventional hull sonars. Achieving larger sizes by conformal sonar array spread over the hull has not been effective so far; for lower frequencies linear or towed arrays are therefore used.

Japanese WW2 sonars operated at a range of frequencies. The Type 91, with a 30-inch quartz projector, worked at 9 kHz. The Type 93, with smaller quartz projectors, operated at 17.5 kHz (model 5 at 16 or 19 kHz magnetostrictive) at powers between 1.7 and 2.5 kilowatts, with a range of up to 6 km. The later Type 3, with German-designed magnetostrictive transducers, operated at 13, 14.5, 16, or 20 kHz (by model), using twin transducers (except model 1, which had three single ones), at 0.2 to 2.5 kilowatts. The simple type used 14.5 kHz magnetostrictive transducers at 0.25 kW, driven by capacitive discharge instead of oscillators, with a range up to 2.5 km.

The sonar's resolution is angular; objects further apart are imaged with lower resolution than nearby ones.

Another source lists ranges and resolutions vs frequencies for sidescan sonars. 30 kHz provides low resolution with range of 1000–6,000 m, 100 kHz gives medium resolution at 500–1,000 m, 300 kHz gives high resolution at 150–500 m, and 600 kHz gives high resolution at 75–150 m. Longer-range sonars are more adversely affected by nonhomogeneities of water. Some environments, typically shallow waters near the coasts, have complicated terrain with many features; higher frequencies become necessary there.

== See also ==
- Baffles (submarine) – Areas behind a submarine or ship where sonar cannot hear
- Gordon Eugene Martin – American physicist (born 1925), sonar physicist

== General bibliography ==
- Dring, Thomas R. (March 2018). "A Steep Learning Curve: The Impact of Sonar Technology, Training, and Tactics on the Initial Years of U.S. Navy Antisubmarine Warfare in World War II". Warship International. LV (January 2018): 37–57. ISSN 0043-0374.
- Hackmann, Willem. Seek & Strike: Sonar, Anti-submarine Warfare and the Royal Navy 1914–54. London: Her Majesty's Stationery Office, 1984. ISBN 0-11-290423-8.
- Hackmann, Willem D. "Sonar Research and Naval Warfare 1914–1954: A Case Study of a Twentieth-Century Science" (subscription required). Historical Studies in the Physical and Biological Sciences 16#1 (January 1986) 83–110. doi:10.2307/27757558.
- Urick, R. J. (1983). Principles of Underwater Sound (3rd edition). Los Altos: Peninsula Publishing. ISBN 9780932146625. OCLC 1132503817.

=== Fisheries acoustics references ===
- Fisheries Acoustics Research (FAR) at the University of Washington
- NOAA Protocols for Fisheries Acoustics Surveys
- Acoustics Unpacked—A "how to" great reference for freshwater hydroacoustics for resource assessment
- "ACOUSTICS IN FISHERIES AND AQUATIC ECOLOGY"
- "Hydroacoustic Protocol – Lakes, Reservoirs and Lowland Rivers" (for fish assessment)
- Simmonds, E. John, and D. N. MacLennan. Fisheries Acoustics: Theory and Practice, second edition. Fish and aquatic resources series, 10. Oxford: Blackwell Science, 2003. ISBN 978-0-632-05994-2.
