= Matteucci =

Matteucci is an Italian surname. Notable people with the surname include:

- Alice Matteucci (born 1995), Italian tennis player
- Amos Matteucci (1915–2008), Italian javelin thrower
- Andrea Matteucci (born 1962), Italian criminal and serial killer
- Carlo Matteucci (1811–1868), Italian physicist and neurophysiologist
- Domenico Matteucci (1895–1976), Italian sport shooter
- Ella Matteucci (born 1993), Canadian ice hockey and baseball player
- Emanuele Matteucci (born 2000), Italian professional footballer
- Enzo Matteucci (1933–1992), Italian footballer and manager
- Felice Matteucci (1808–1887), Italian engineer and inventor
- Mike Matteucci (born 1971), Canadian ice hockey player
- Pellegrino Matteucci (1850–1881), Italian explorer
- Pellegrino Matteucci (admiral) (1887–1971), Italian admiral during World War II
- Sergio Matteucci (1931–2020), Italian voice actor and radio presenter
- Sherry Scheel Matteucci (born 1947), American attorney

== See also ==
- Matteucci effect, a magnetomechanical effect
- Matteucci Medal, an Italian award for physicists
- Barsanti–Matteucci engine, an internal combustion
- Matteo Salvucci, an Italian painter also known as Mattiuccio Salvucci
