= Magnetomechanical effect =

In magnetism, a magnetomechanical effect or a magnetoelastic effect is a phenomenon of changing the magnetic properties of ferromagnetic materials by applying external stresses. The application of external stresses alters the flux density of a magnetized ferromagnet, and thus the shape, and size of its hysteresis loops. Various effects exist, depending on the material.

The first person to identify a magnetomechanical effect was James Prescott Joule in 1842.

== Effects ==
Magnetomechanical effects connect magnetic, mechanical and electric phenomena in solid materials. Examples include

=== Magnetostriction and inverse magnetostrictive effect ===
Magnetostriction, also known as Joule magnetostriction, is the few parts per million change in the length of a ferromagnetic rod upon magnetization. The inverse magnetostrictive effect (also known as Villari effect, after Emilio Villari) is the change in magnetization in response to compressive stress. Magnetostriction is thermodynamically opposite to inverse magnetostriction effect.

=== Torque effects ===
Wiedemann effect (named after Gustav Heinrich Wiedemann) is the twist in a ferromagnetic rod carrying a current induced by magnetization. The Matteucci effect (named after Carlo Matteucci) is the inverse effect.

The effect of creating a magnetization by twisting a rod that is longitudinally magnetized is sometimes called the Wertheim effect (after Guillaume Wertheim).

=== ΔE effect ===
The Guillemin effect is the tendency of a previously bent rod to straighten when exposed to a strong magnetic field along its axis. It was first reported by Claude-Marie Guillemin in 1846 in the specific form of the change in the deflection of an iron cantilever when subjected to a coaxial magnetic field. It was later generalized and called the ΔE effect, where it refers to changes to E, the Young's modulus. Longitudinal current can cause a similar change in deflection.

=== Volume effects ===
A change in volume due to the application of a magnetic field is called the Barret effect (after William F. Barrett who presented it 1882). The reciprocal effect is called the Nagaoka–Honda effect (named after Hantaro Nagaoka and Kotaro Honda in 1898).

== See also ==
- Magnetocrystalline anisotropy
- Magnetohydrodynamics
- Electrohydrodynamics
