= Eduard Hagenbach-Bischoff =

Swiss physicist (1833–1910)

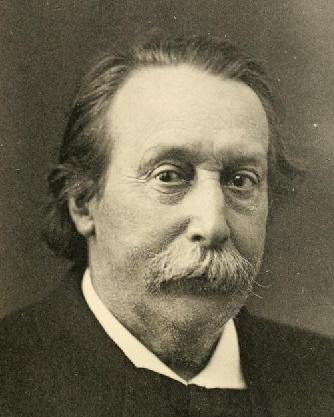
- Born: February 20, 1833; Basel, Switzerland
- Died: December 23, 1910 (aged 77); Basel, Switzerland
- Education: University of Basel (PhD)
- Known for: Hagenbach-Bischoff quota
- Children: August Hagenbach
- Father: Karl Rudolf Hagenbach
- Scientific career
- Fields: Physics
- Workplaces: University of Basel

Eduard Hagenbach-Bischoff (20 February 1833– 23 December 1910 was a Swiss physicist. He invented an electoral quota very similar to the Droop quota.

The son of the theologian Karl Rudolf Hagenbach, he studied physics and mathematics in Basel (with Rudolf Merian), Berlin (with Heinrich Wilhelm Dove and Heinrich Gustav Magnus), Geneva, Paris (with Jules Célestin Jamin) and obtained his Ph.D. in 1855 at Basel. He taught at the Gewerbeschule (vocational school) in Basel and was after his habilitation, a professor of mathematics at the University of Basel for one year. From 1863 to 1906, he was a full professor of physics at Basel (successor of Gustav Heinrich Wiedemann). In 1874, he became director of the institute of physics at the newly founded “Bernoullianum” in Basel, and from 1874 to 1879 he was president of the Swiss Academy of Sciences.

Hagenbach-Bischoff was involved in the popularisation of science, and at the “Bernoullianum” he gave more than 100 popular talks, such as one in 1896 on the newly discovered X rays.

He invented a type of quota to be used in elections.

He is the father of physicist August Hagenbach.
