= Hagenbach (disambiguation) =

Hagenbach may refer to:

- Hagenbach, a town in Rhineland-Palatinate, Germany, seat of the Verbandsgemeinde
  - Hagenbach (Verbandsgemeinde), a Verbandsgemeinde ("collective municipality") in Rhineland-Palatinate, Germany
- Hagenbach, Haut-Rhin, a commune in the Haut-Rhin department in Alsace in France
- Hagenbach (Hassel), a river of Saxony-Anhalt, Germany
- Hagenbach (river), a river of North Rhine-Westphalia, Germany
- Hagenbach (surname)
