= Wüllner =

Wüllner or Wuellner is a German surname. People with the surname include:

- Adolf Wüllner (1835–1908), German physicist
- Franz Wüllner (1832–1902), German pianist, conductor, conservatory director and composer, father of Ludwig
- Ludwig Wüllner (1858–1938), German concert and operatic tenor, actor and reciter, son of Franz
- Robert Wuellner (1885–1966), Swiss actor, film producer and director
