= Francesco Appiani =

Italian painter (1704–1792)

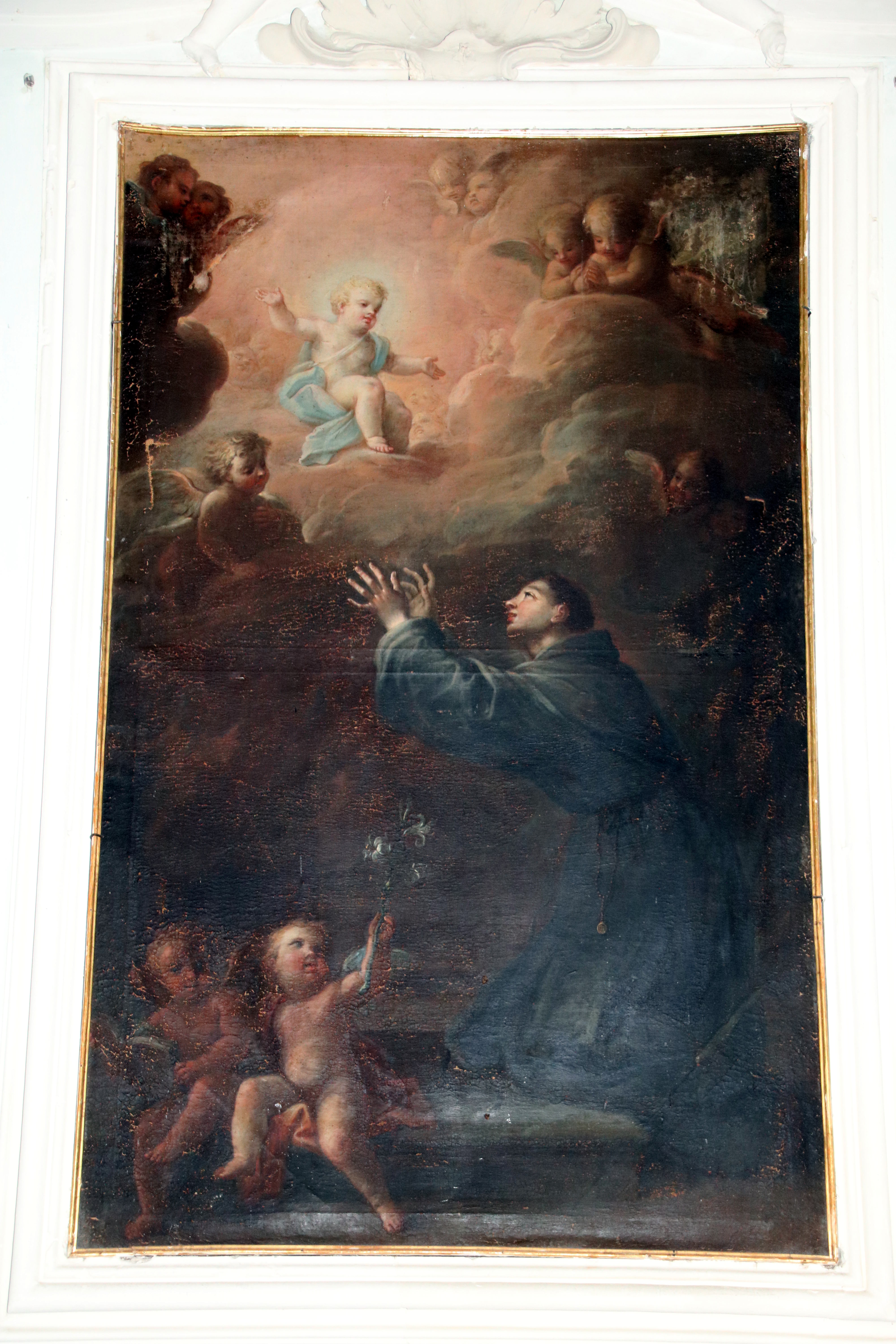
Saint Francis of Padua Adoring the Child, Church of San Francesco, Bevagna

Francesco Appiani (29 January 1704 – 1792) was an Italian painter of the late-Baroque period, active mainly in Rome and Perugia.

== Biography ==
Appiani was born in Ancona. He was a pupil of Domenico Simonetti, and then later moved to Rome to study under Francesco Trevisani, Francesco Mancini, and Giovanni Paolo Pannini.

He mainly worked in Perugia. Among his works is a Death of San Domenico painted for the church of San Sisto Vecchio. He is known for his altarpiece in the Perugia Cathedral. He also painted lunettes for a church of a Benedictine convent dedicated to fallen women. In the chapel was an altarpiece by his contemporary Sebastiano Conca. The vault was frescoed by Cesare Sermei and the high altar had a painting by Matteo Salvucci. The church is today a political meeting hall. He died in Perugia, aged about 88.

== Bibliography ==
- Farquhar, Maria (1855). Ralph Nicholson Wornum (ed.). Biographical catalogue of the principal Italian painters. London: Woodfall & Kinder. p. 10.
