= Heinrich Gustav Magnus =

German chemist and physicist (1802–1870)

Heinrich Gustav Magnus ForMemRS
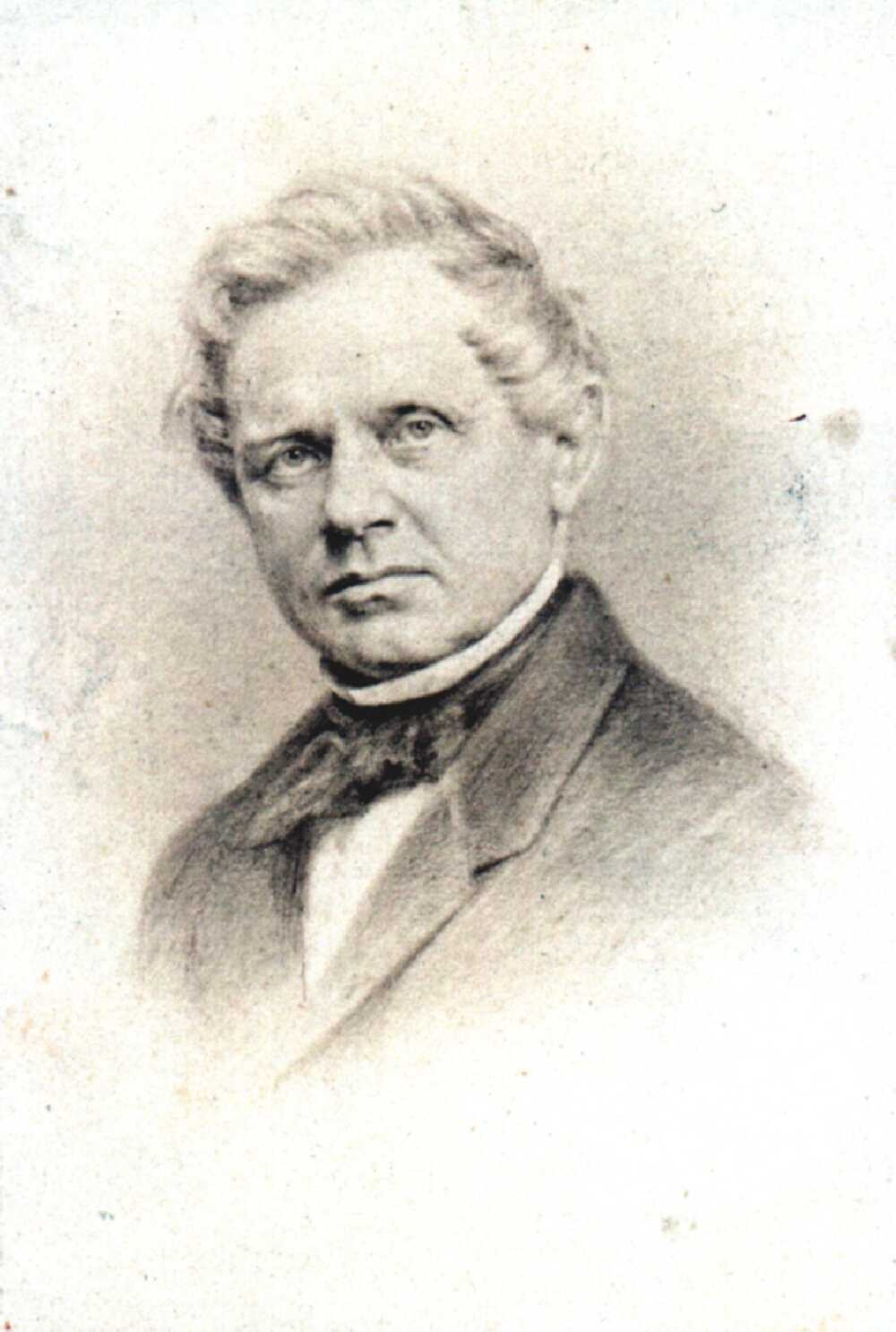
- Born: 2 May 1802; Berlin, Margraviate of Brandenburg, Holy Roman Empire
- Died: 4 April 1870 (aged 67); Berlin, Kingdom of Prussia
- Education: Berlin University; Stockholm University; Sorbonne
- Known for: August–Roche–Magnus formula Magnus effect Magnus' green salt Diathermancy; Isethionic acid Periodic acid
- Scientific career
- Fields: Chemistry, physics
- Workplaces: Berlin University
- Thesis: De tellurio (1827)
- Doctoral advisor: Eilhard Mitscherlich
- Doctoral students: Hermann Knoblauch; August Kundt; Emil Warburg; Gustav Wiedemann
- Other notable students: Wilhelm von Beetz Rudolf Clausius; Eduard Hagenbach-Bischoff; Wilhelm Heinrich Heintz; Hermann Helmholtz; Gustav Karsten; Alexander Mitscherlich; Arthur von Oettingen; Georg Hermann Quincke; Edward Schunck Adolf Wüllner

Heinrich Gustav Magnus (German: [ˈhaɪnʁɪç ˈɡʊstaːf ˈmaːɡnʊs]; 2 May 1802 – 4 April 1870) was a German experimental scientist. His training was mostly in chemistry but his later research was mostly in physics. He spent the great bulk of his career at the University of Berlin, where he is remembered for his laboratory teaching as much as for his original research. He did not use his first given name, and was known throughout his life as Gustav Magnus.

== Education ==
Magnus was born in Berlin to a Jewish family, his father a wealthy merchant. In his youth he received private instruction in mathematics and natural science. At the University of Berlin he studied chemistry and physics, 1822–27, and obtained a doctorate for a dissertation on tellurium in 1827. His doctoral adviser was Eilhard Mitscherlich. He then went to Stockholm for a year as a visiting research fellow at the laboratory of Jöns Jakob Berzelius (who was a personal friend of Mitscherlich). That was followed by a year in Paris at the laboratory of Joseph Louis Gay-Lussac and Louis Jacques Thénard. Therefore, he had a first-rate education in experimental science when in 1831 he was appointed lecturer in physics and technology at the University of Berlin. In 1834 he became assistant professor, and in 1845 was appointed full professor, and later he was elected the dean of the faculty.

== Teaching ==
As a teacher at the University of Berlin his success was rapid and extraordinary. His lucid style and the perfection of his experimental demonstrations drew to his lectures a crowd of enthusiastic scholars, on whom he impressed the importance of applied science; and he further found time to hold weekly colloquies on physical questions at his house with a small circle of young students. Furthermore, Magnus's laboratory was one of the best equipped in the world during the years when he was professor in Berlin, and especially during the decade of the 1840s. This was as a result of his inherited money, his focus on experiment in chemistry and physics, his knowledge of the state-of-the-art methods, the scarcity of other laboratories in Europe at the time, and finally the high value he placed on facilitating the researches of up-and-coming young scientists. Well-known names in the history of physics who were beneficiaries of Magnus's laboratory in the 1840s include Rudolf Clausius, Hermann Helmholtz and Gustav Wiedemann. Magnus's laboratory, which he privately owned, was integrated into the University of Berlin.

== Research ==
Magnus published 84 papers in research journals. His research output was continuous over his lifetime: the first memoir was published in 1825 when he was still a student, and the last appeared shortly after his death in 1870. From 1825 to 1833, he was occupied mainly with chemical researches. These resulted in the discovery of the first of the platino-ammonium class of compounds (see Magnus's green salt). He was first to identify the three sulfonic acids sulphovinic acid, ethionic acid and isethionic acid and their salts; and, in cooperation with CF Ammermüller, of per-iodic acid and its salts. He also reported on the diminution in density produced in garnet and vesuvianite by melting (1831). Subjects on which he published research after 1833 include: the absorption of gases in blood (1837–1845); the expansion of gases by heat (1841–1844); the vapour pressures of water and various solutions (1844–1854); thermoelectricity (1851); electrolysis of metallic salts in solution (1857); electromagnetic induction of currents (1858–1861); absorption and conduction of heat in gases (1860s); polarization of heat (1866–1868); and the deflection of projectiles from firearms (see Magnus effect). From 1861, he devoted much attention to the question of diathermancy in gases and vapours, especially to the behaviour in this respect of dry and moist air, and to the thermal effects produced by the condensation of moisture on solid surfaces. Magnus was an experimenter, not a theoretician.

== Other activities ==
His great reputation led to his being entrusted by the government with several missions; e.g. in 1865 he represented Prussia in the conference called at Frankfurt am Main to introduce a uniform metric system of weights and measures into Germany. He married in 1840 Bertha Humblot, of a French Huguenot family settled in Berlin, by whom he left a son and two daughters.

== See also ==
- Carbyl sulfate
- Diathermancy
- Periodate
