= Hermann Ebert =

German physicist

- Born: 20 June 1861; Leipzig, Germany
- Died: 12 February 1913 (aged 51); Munich, Germany
- Occupation: Physicist
- Known for: Research in atmospheric electricity, Ebert-Fastie spectrometer

Hermann Ebert (20 June 1861 in Leipzig – 12 February 1913 in Munich) was a German physicist.

From 1881 he studied astronomy and physics in Leipzig, where he was a student of Heinrich Bruns and Gustav Wiedemann. After graduation, he relocated to the University of Erlangen as an assistant to Eilhard Wiedemann, the son of his former instructor. In 1894 he was chosen as an associate professor of theoretical physics in Leipzig, and later the same year, he became a professor of experimental physics at the University of Kiel. From 1898 onward, he was a professor of experimental physics at the Technical University in Munich.

His earlier scientific work dealt largely with subjects such as spectroscopy and electric discharges in gases. While at Munich, he conducted important, pioneer research of atmospheric electricity. His other scientific interests included solar physics, zodiacal light, lunar craters, atmospheric optics and the Earth's magnetic field.

His name is associated with the "Ebert-Fastie spectrometer", an optical device built by William George Fastie of Johns Hopkins University based on Ebert's design of a monochromator in 1889, and "Ebert's apparatus", an electrometer used to measure the concentration of atmospheric ions.

== Published works ==
He was the author of many works on numerous subjects in physics, including Magnetische Kraftfelder: Die Erscheinungen des Magnetismus, Elektromagnetismus und der Induktion dargestellt auf Grund des Kraftlinien Begriffes, later translated into English and published as: "Magnetic fields of force; an exposition of the phenomena of magnetism, electro-magnetism and induction based on the conception of lines of force". The following are a few of his other writings:

- Zwei Formen von Spectrographen, 1889 - Two forms of spectrography.
- Ueber Kathodoluminescenz, 1894 - On cathode luminescence.
- Zur Mechanik der Glimmlichtphänomene, 1899 - The mechanics of "glow phenomena".
- Aëronautische Meteorologie und Physik der Atmosphäre, 1902 - Aeronautic meteorology and atmospheric physics.
- Die Elektrophysik und die Theorie des Elektromagnetismus, 1902 (with Curt Heinke) - Electrical physics and the theory of electromagnetism.
- Physikalisches Praktikum, 1904 (with Eilhard Wiedemann) - Practical physics.
