= Hagenbach (surname) =

Hagenbach is a surname, and may refer to:

- August Hagenbach (1871 – 1949), Swiss physicist working in spectroscopy
- Carl Friedrich Hagenbach (1771 – 1849), Swiss botanist and physician
- Jacob Johann Hagenbach (1802? – 1825), Swiss entomologist
- Karl Rudolf Hagenbach (1801 – 1874), Swiss church theologian and historian
- Peter von Hagenbach (circa 1420 – 1474), Burgundian knight, Germanic military and civil commander and convicted war criminal
