= Wiedemann effect =

Magnetoelectric efffect

The Wiedemann effect is the twisting of a ferromagnetic rod through which an electric current is flowing when the rod is placed in a longitudinal magnetic field, caused by the total helical magnetic field. It is the inverse of the Matteucci effect. It was discovered by the German physicist Gustav Wiedemann in 1858 . The Wiedemann effect is one of the manifestations of magnetostriction in a field formed by the combination of a longitudinal magnetic field and a circular magnetic field that is created by an electric current. If the electric current (or the magnetic field) is alternating, the rod will begin torsional oscillation.

In linear approach angle of rod torsion α does not depend on its cross-section form and is defined only by current density and magnetoelastic properties of the rod:

$$\alpha = j \frac{h_{15}}{2G}$$,

where

- $j$ is current density;
- $h_{15}$ is magnetoelastic parameter, proportional to longitudinal magnetic field value;
- $G$ is the shear modulus.

== Applications ==
Magnetostrictive position sensors use the Wiedemann effect to excite an ultrasonic pulse. Typically a small magnet is used to mark a position along a magnetostrictive wire. The magnetic field from a short current pulse in the wire combined with that from the position magnet excites the ultrasonic pulse. The time required for this pulse to travel from the point of excitation to a pickup at the end of the wire gives the position. Reflections from the other end of the wire could lead to disturbances. In order to avoid this the wire is connected to a mechanical damper that end.

== See also ==
- Matteucci effect the inverse effect
- Magnetostriction
- Magnetomechanical effects for a collection of similar effects
