= Sunlight =

Light emitted by the Sun

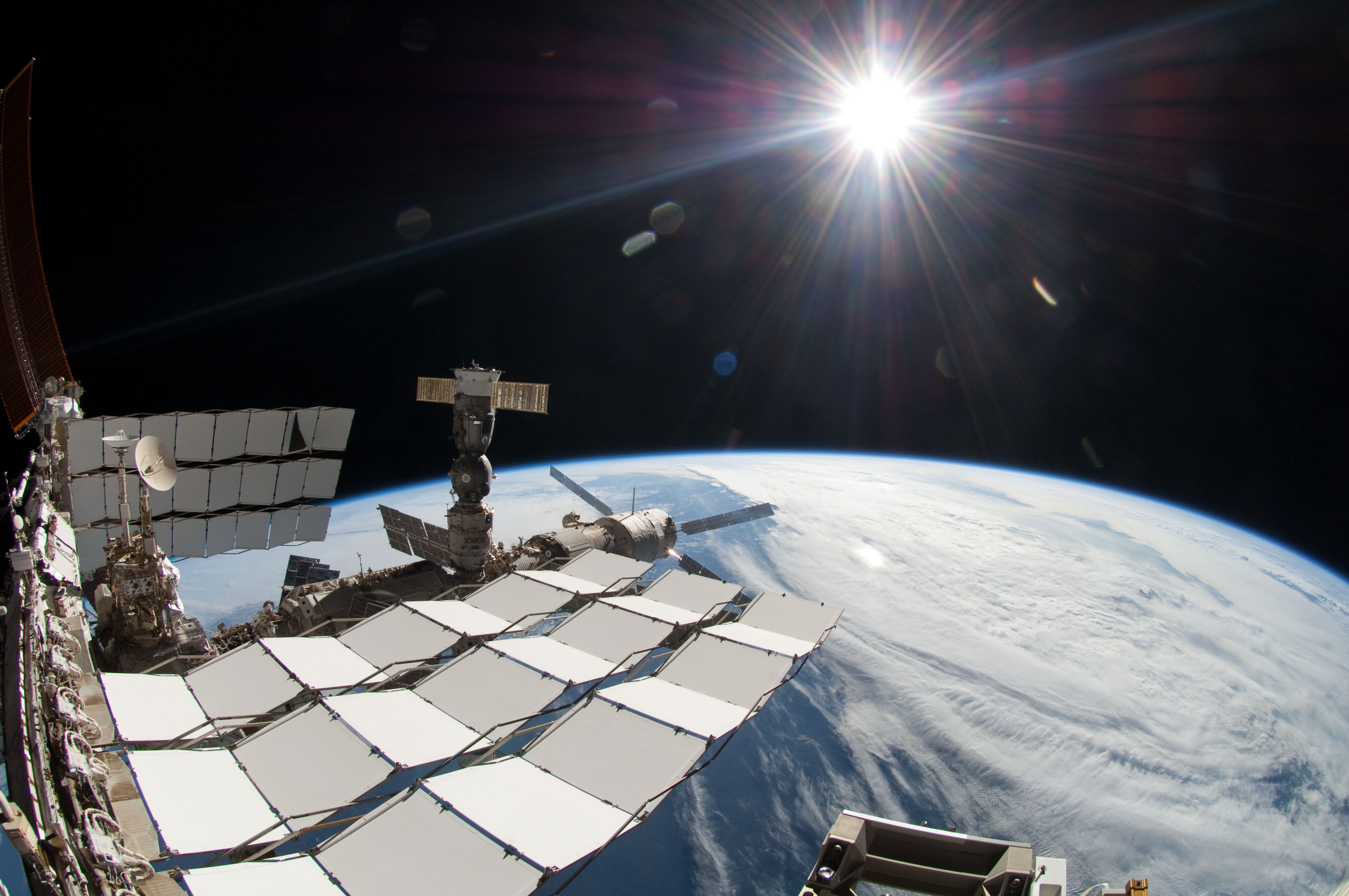
The Sun, as seen aboard the International Space Station in low Earth orbit. Spacecraft experience the full solar spectrum unfiltered by the lower atmosphere, with bright white sunlight.

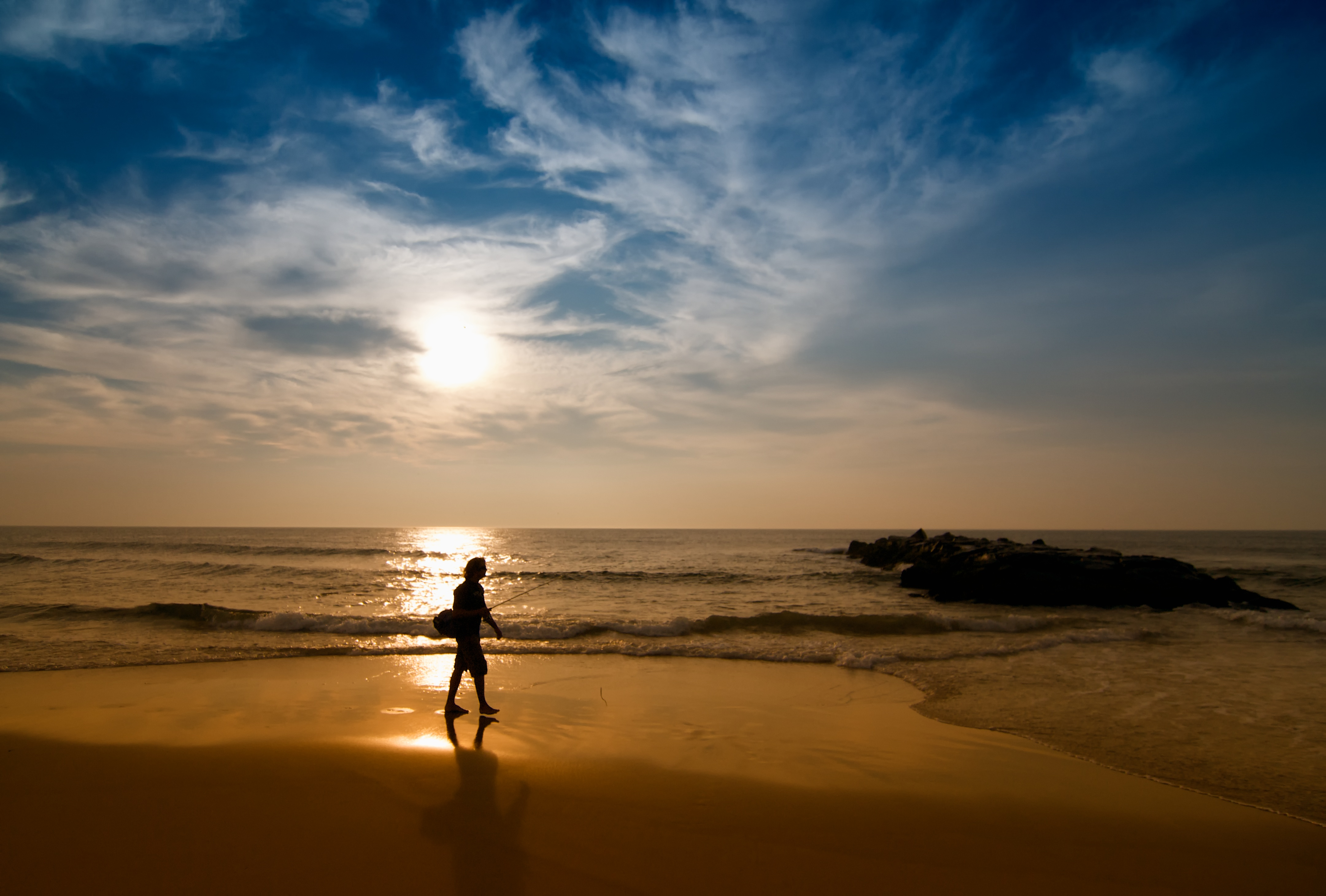

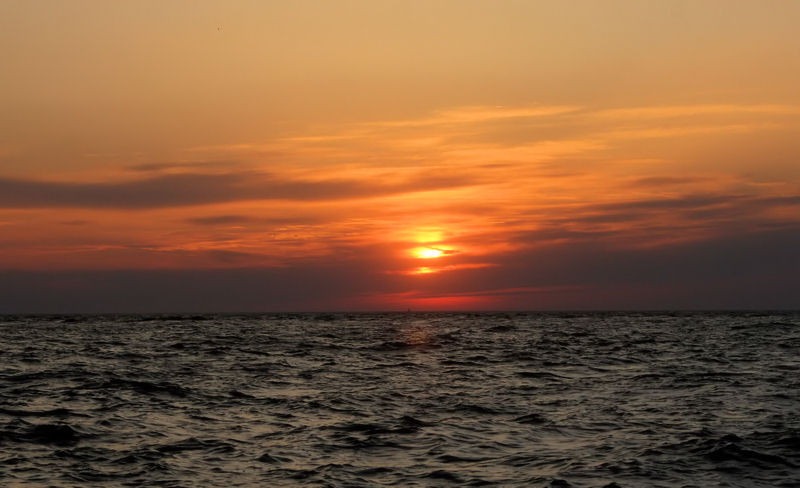
Sunlight shining upon two different sides of the U.S. state of New Jersey. Sunrise on the Jersey Shore at Spring Lake, Monmouth County (above), and sunset on the Shore at Sunset Beach, Cape May County (below). Both are filtered through high stratus clouds.

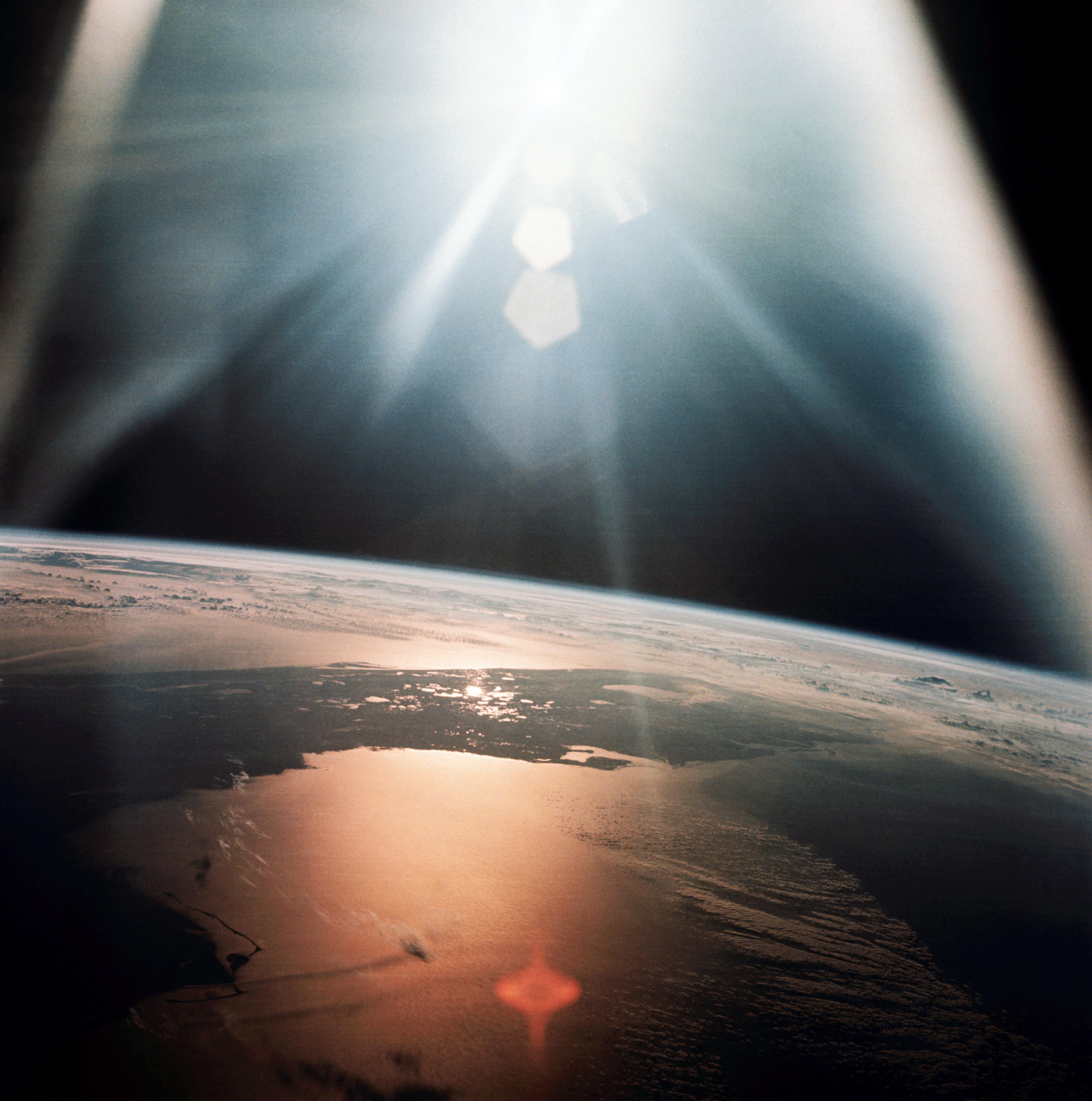
Sunrise over the Gulf of Mexico and Florida. Taken on 20 October 1968 from Apollo 7.

Sunlight is the portion of the electromagnetic radiation which is emitted by the Sun (i.e. solar radiation) and received by the Earth, in particular the visible light perceptible to the human eye as well as invisible infrared (typically perceived by humans as warmth) and ultraviolet (which can have physiological effects such as sunburn) lights. However, according to the American Meteorological Society, there are "conflicting conventions as to whether all three [...] are referred to as light, or whether that term should only be applied to the visible portion of the spectrum".

Upon reaching the Earth, sunlight is scattered and filtered through the Earth's atmosphere as daylight when the Sun is above the horizon. When direct solar radiation is not blocked by clouds, it is experienced as sunshine, a combination of bright light and radiant heat (atmospheric). When blocked by clouds or reflected off other objects, sunlight is diffused. Sources estimate a global average of between 164 watts to 340 watts per square meter over a 24-hour day; this figure is estimated by NASA to be about a quarter of Earth's average total solar irradiance.

Sunlight takes about 8.3 minutes to reach Earth from the surface of the Sun. A photon starting at the center of the Sun and changing direction every time it encounters a charged particle would take between 10,000 and 170,000 years to get to the surface. Sunlight is a key factor in photosynthesis, the process used by plants and other autotrophic organisms to convert light energy, normally from the Sun, into chemical energy that can be used to synthesize carbohydrates and fuel the organisms' activities. The ultraviolet radiation in sunlight has both positive and negative health effects, as it is both a requisite for vitamin D_{3} synthesis and a mutagen.

Daylighting is the natural lighting of interior spaces by admitting sunlight. Solar irradiance is the rate of solar energy received by a unit area from sunlight.

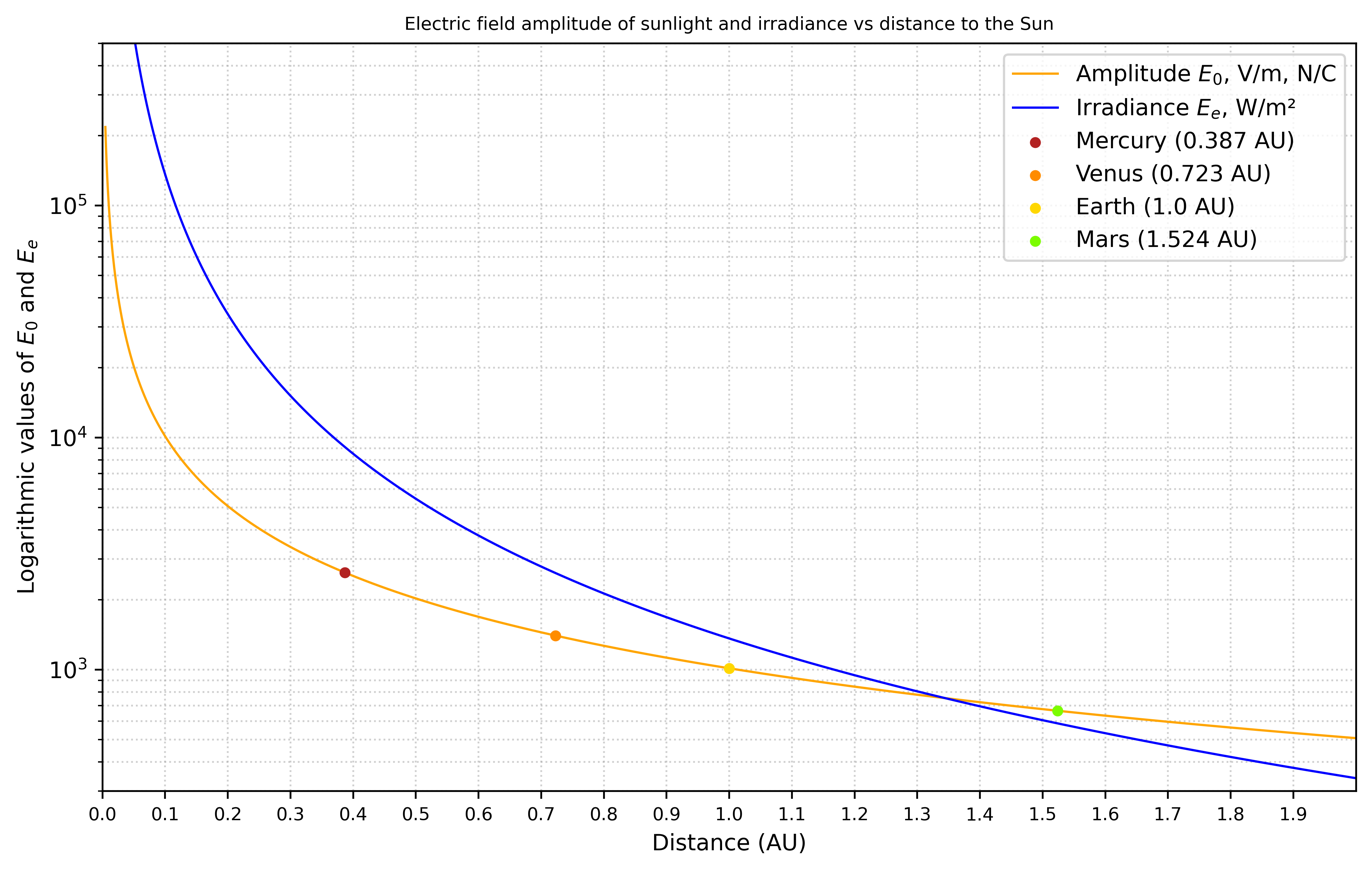
A plot showing amplitude of electric field of sunlight and irradiance based on distance to the Sun. Electric field amplitude at 1 astronomical unit (149.6 million kilometres) is about 1013 V/m.

== Measurement ==
Researchers can measure the intensity of sunlight using a sunshine recorder, pyranometer, or pyrheliometer. To calculate the amount of sunlight reaching the ground, both the eccentricity of Earth's elliptic orbit and the attenuation by Earth's atmosphere have to be taken into account. The extraterrestrial solar illuminance (E_{ext}), corrected for the elliptic orbit by using the day number of the year (dn), is given to a good approximation by

$$E_{\rm ext}= E_{\rm sc} \cdot \left(1+0.033412 \cdot \cos\left(2\pi\frac{{\rm dn}-3}{365}\right)\right),$$

where dn=1 on January 1; dn=32 on February 1; dn=59 on March 1 (except on leap years, where dn=60), etc. In this formula dn–3 is used, because in modern times Earth's perihelion, the closest approach to the Sun and, therefore, the maximum E_{ext} occurs around January 3 each year. The value of 0.033412 is determined knowing that the ratio between the perihelion (0.98328989 AU) squared and the aphelion (1.01671033 AU) squared should be approximately 0.935338.

The solar illuminance constant (E_{sc}), is equal to 128×10^{3} lux. The direct normal illuminance (E_{dn}), corrected for the attenuating effects of the atmosphere is given by:

$$E_{\rm dn}=E_{\rm ext}\,e^{-cm},$$

where c is the atmospheric extinction and m is the relative optical airmass. The atmospheric extinction brings the number of lux down to around 100,000 lux.

The total amount of energy received at ground level from the Sun at the zenith depends on the distance to the Sun and thus on the time of year. It is about 3.3% higher than average in January and 3.3% lower in July (see below). If the extraterrestrial solar radiation is 1,367 watts per square meter (the value when the Earth–Sun distance is 1 astronomical unit), then the direct sunlight at Earth's surface when the Sun is at the zenith is about 1,050 W/m^{2}, but the total amount (direct and indirect from the atmosphere) hitting the ground is around 1,120 W/m^{2}. In terms of energy, sunlight at Earth's surface is around 52 to 55 percent infrared (above 700 nm), 42 to 43 percent visible (400 to 700 nm), and 3 to 5 percent ultraviolet (below 400 nm). At the top of the atmosphere, sunlight is about 30% more intense, having about 8% ultraviolet (UV), with most of the extra UV consisting of biologically damaging short-wave ultraviolet.

Direct sunlight has a luminous efficacy of about 93 lumens per watt of radiant flux. This is higher than the efficacy (of source) of artificial lighting other than LEDs, which means using sunlight for illumination heats up a room less than fluorescent or incandescent lighting. Multiplying the figure of 1,050 watts per square meter by 93 lumens per watt indicates that bright sunlight provides an illuminance of approximately 98,000 lux (lumens per square meter) on a perpendicular surface at sea level. The illumination of a horizontal surface will be considerably less than this if the Sun is not very high in the sky. Averaged over a day, the highest amount of sunlight on a horizontal surface occurs in January at the South Pole (see insolation).

Dividing the irradiance of 1,050 W/m^{2} by the size of the Sun's disk in steradians gives an average radiance of 15.4 MW per square metre per steradian. (However, the radiance at the center of the Sun's disk is somewhat higher than the average over the whole disk due to limb darkening.) Multiplying this by π gives an upper limit to the irradiance which can be focused on a surface using mirrors: 48.5 MW/m^{2}.

== Composition and power ==
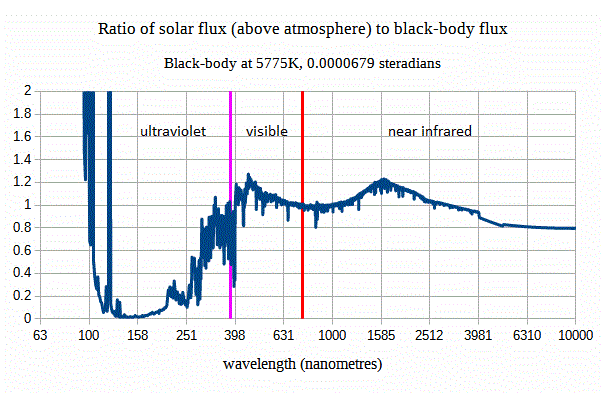
Solar spectrum compared to black-body at 5775 K

The spectrum of the Sun's solar radiation can be compared to that of a black body with a temperature of about 5,800 K (see graph). The Sun emits EM radiation across most of the electromagnetic spectrum. Although the radiation created in the solar core consists mostly of x rays, internal absorption and thermalization convert these super-high-energy photons to lower-energy photons before they reach the Sun's surface and are emitted out into space. As a result, the photosphere of the Sun does not emit much X radiation (solar X-rays), although it does emit such "hard radiations" as X-rays and even gamma rays during solar flares. The quiet (non-flaring) Sun, including its corona, emits a broad range of wavelengths: X-rays, ultraviolet, visible light, infrared, and radio waves. Different depths in the photosphere have different temperatures, and this partially explains the deviations from a black-body spectrum.

There is also a flux of gamma rays from the quiescent Sun, obeying a power law between 0.5 and 2.6 TeV. Some gamma rays are caused by cosmic rays interacting with the solar atmosphere, but this does not explain these findings.

The only direct signature of the nuclear processes in the core of the Sun is via the very weakly interacting neutrinos.

Solar spectral irradiance (watts per square metre per nanometre) above atmosphere (yellow) and at surface (red). Extreme UV and X-rays are produced (left of wavelength range) but comprise very small amounts of the Sun's total output power (area under the curve).

Spectral distribution of sunlight. The different curves reflect 3 different equally valid ways of characterizing the same sunlight. These curves have peaks at different wavelengths, which demonstrates that the notion of a location where the "peak" amount of sunlight is emitted is not meaningful, and is not a characteristic of the light itself (but is merely an artifact of how the spectrum is represented). Percentiles offer a way of thinking about the distribution of energy which is independent of the representation. 50 percent of solar irradiance is associated with wavelengths less than about 711 nm (based on approximating sunlight by the emissions of a 5775 K blackbody).

Although the solar corona is a source of extreme ultraviolet and X-ray radiation, these rays make up only a very small amount of the power output of the Sun (see spectrum at right). The spectrum of nearly all (roughly 98.7%) of the solar electromagnetic radiation striking the Earth's atmosphere spans a range of 200 nm to about 4000 nm. This band of significant radiation power can be divided into five regions in increasing order of wavelengths:

- Ultraviolet C or (UVC) range, which spans a range of 100 to 280 nm. The term ultraviolet refers to the fact that the radiation is at higher frequency than violet light (and, hence, also invisible to the human eye). Due to absorption by the atmosphere very little reaches Earth's surface. This spectrum of radiation has germicidal properties, as used in germicidal lamps.
- Ultraviolet B or (UVB) range spans 280 to 315 nm. It is also greatly absorbed by the Earth's atmosphere, and along with UVC causes the photochemical reaction leading to the production of the ozone layer. It directly damages DNA and causes sunburn. In addition to this short-term effect it enhances skin ageing and significantly promotes the development of skin cancer, but is also required for vitamin D synthesis in the skin of mammals.
- Ultraviolet A or (UVA) spans 315 to 400 nm. This band was once held to be less damaging to DNA, and hence is used in cosmetic artificial sun tanning (tanning booths and tanning beds) and PUVA therapy for psoriasis. However, UVA is now known to cause significant damage to DNA via indirect routes (formation of free radicals and reactive oxygen species), and can cause cancer.
- Visible range or light spans 380 to 700 nm. As the name suggests, this range is visible to the naked eye.
- Infrared range that spans 700 nm to 1,000,000 nm (1 mm). It comprises an important part of the electromagnetic radiation that reaches Earth. Scientists divide the infrared range into three types on the basis of wavelength:
  - Infrared-A: 700 nm to 1,400 nm
  - Infrared-B: 1,400 nm to 3,000 nm
  - Infrared-C: 3,000 nm to 1 mm.

The sunlight reaching Earth's surface is 49.4% infrared, 42.3% visible, and 8% ultraviolet.

It is sometimes asserted that the Sun's maximum output is in the visible range. However, this statement is a misconception based on only seeing the solar spectral irradiance plotted on a per-wavelength basis. When plotted that way, the power spectral density of sunlight peaks at a wavelength of about 501 nm, which is in the visible range. However, the solar spectral irradiance can with equal validity be calculated on a per-frequency basis, in which case the maximum is at 3.40×10^{14} Hz, corresponding to a wavelength of about 882 nm, which is in the near infrared (Infrared-A) range. Counterintuitively, it is not meaningful to assert that the solar output is greatest at some precise location in the spectrum.

=== Published tables ===
Tables of direct solar radiation on various slopes from 0 to 60 degrees north latitude, in calories per square centimetre, issued in 1972 and published by Pacific Northwest Forest and Range Experiment Station, Forest Service, U.S. Department of Agriculture, Portland, Oregon, USA, appear on the web.

== Intensity in the Solar System ==
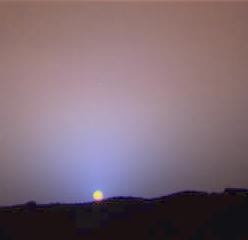
Sunlight on Mars is dimmer than on Earth. This photo of a Martian sunset was imaged by Mars Pathfinder.

Different bodies of the Solar System receive light of an intensity inversely proportional to the square of their distance from the Sun.

A table comparing the amount of solar radiation received by each planet in the Solar System at the top of its atmosphere:

Planet or dwarf planet	distance (AU)		Solar radiation (W/m^{2})	
Planet or dwarf planet	Perihelion	Aphelion	maximum	minimum
Mercury	0.3075	0.4667	14,446	6,272
Venus	0.7184	0.7282	2,647	2,576
Earth	0.9833	1.017	1,413	1,321
Mars	1.382	1.666	715	492
Jupiter	4.950	5.458	55.8	45.9
Saturn	9.048	10.12	16.7	13.4
Uranus	18.38	20.08	4.04	3.39
Neptune	29.77	30.44	1.54	1.47
Pluto	29.66	48.87	1.55	0.57

The actual brightness of sunlight that would be observed at the surface also depends on the presence and composition of an atmosphere. For example, Venus's thick atmosphere reflects more than 60% of the solar light it receives. The actual illumination of the surface is about 14,000 lux, comparable to that on Earth "in the daytime with overcast clouds".

Sunlight on Mars would be more or less like daylight on Earth during a slightly overcast day, and, as can be seen in the pictures taken by the rovers, there is enough diffuse sky radiation that shadows would not seem particularly dark. Thus, it would give perceptions and "feel" very much like Earth daylight. The spectrum on the surface is slightly redder than that on Earth, due to scattering by reddish dust in the Martian atmosphere.

For comparison, sunlight on Saturn is slightly brighter than Earth sunlight at the average sunset or sunrise. Even on Pluto, the sunlight would still be bright enough to almost match the average living room. To see sunlight as dim as full moonlight on Earth, a distance of about 500 AU (~69 light-hours) is needed; only a handful of objects in the Solar System have been discovered that are known to orbit farther than such a distance, among them 90377 Sedna and (87269) 2000 OO67.

== Variations in solar irradiance ==
=== Seasonal and orbital variation ===
On Earth, the solar radiation varies with the angle of the Sun above the horizon, with longer sunlight duration at high latitudes during summer, varying to no sunlight at all in winter near the pertinent pole. When the direct radiation is not blocked by clouds, it is experienced as sunshine. The warming of the ground (and other objects) depends on the absorption of the electromagnetic radiation in the form of heat.

The amount of radiation intercepted by a planetary body varies inversely with the square of the distance between the star and the planet. Earth's orbit and obliquity change with time (over thousands of years), sometimes forming a nearly perfect circle, and at other times stretching out to an orbital eccentricity of 5% (currently 1.67%). As the orbital eccentricity changes, the average distance from the Sun (the semimajor axis does not significantly vary, and so the total insolation over a year remains almost constant due to Kepler's second law,

$$\tfrac{2A}{r^2}dt = d\theta,$$

where $A$ is the "areal velocity" invariant. That is, the integration over the orbital period (also invariant) is a constant.

$$\int_{0}^{T} \tfrac{2A}{r^2}dt = \int_{0}^{2\pi} d\theta = \mathrm{constant}.$$

If we assume the solar radiation power P as a constant over time and the solar irradiation given by the inverse-square law, we obtain also the average insolation as a constant. However, the seasonal and latitudinal distribution and intensity of solar radiation received at Earth's surface does vary. The effect of Sun angle on climate results in the change in solar energy in summer and winter. For example, at latitudes of 65 degrees, this can vary by more than 25% as a result of Earth's orbital variation. Because changes in winter and summer tend to offset, the change in the annual average insolation at any given location is near zero, but the redistribution of energy between summer and winter does strongly affect the intensity of seasonal cycles. Such changes associated with the redistribution of solar energy are considered a likely cause for the coming and going of recent ice ages (see: Milankovitch cycles).

=== Solar intensity variation ===
Space-based observations of solar irradiance started in 1978. These measurements show that the solar constant is not constant. It varies on many time scales, including the 11-year sunspot solar cycle. When going further back in time, one has to rely on irradiance reconstructions, using sunspots for the past 400 years or cosmogenic radionuclides for going back 10,000 years.

Such reconstructions have been done. These studies show that in addition to the solar irradiance variation with the solar cycle (the (Schwabe) cycle), the solar activity varies with longer cycles, such as the proposed 88 year (Gleisberg cycle), 208 year (DeVries cycle) and 1,000 year (Eddy cycle).

== Solar irradiance ==
=== Solar constant ===
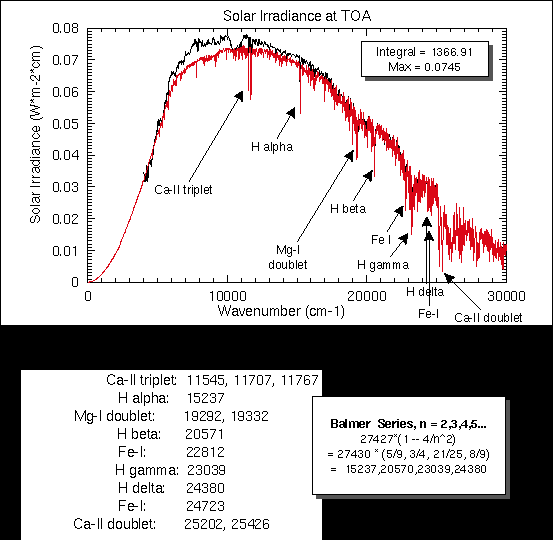
Solar irradiance spectrum at top of atmosphere, on a linear scale and plotted against wavenumber.

The solar constant is a measure of flux density, is the amount of incoming solar electromagnetic radiation per unit area that would be incident on a plane perpendicular to the rays, at a distance of one astronomical unit (AU) (roughly the mean distance from the Sun to Earth). The "solar constant" includes all types of solar radiation, not just the visible light. Its average value was thought to be approximately 1,366 W/m^{2}, varying slightly with solar activity, but recent recalibrations of the relevant satellite observations indicate a value closer to 1,361 W/m^{2} is more realistic.

=== Total solar irradiance (TSI) and spectral solar irradiance (SSI) upon Earth ===
Since 1978, a series of overlapping NASA and ESA satellite experiments have measured total solar irradiance (TSI) – the amount of solar radiation received at the top of Earth's atmosphere – as 1.365 kilowatts per square meter (kW/m^{2}). TSI observations continue with the ACRIMSAT/ACRIM3, SOHO/VIRGO and SORCE/TIM satellite experiments. Observations have revealed variation of TSI on many timescales, including the solar magnetic cycle and many shorter periodic cycles. TSI provides the energy that drives Earth's climate, so continuation of the TSI time-series database is critical to understanding the role of solar variability in climate change.

Since 2003, the SORCE Spectral Irradiance Monitor (SIM) has monitored Spectral solar irradiance (SSI) – the spectral distribution of the TSI. Data indicate that SSI at UV (ultraviolet) wavelength corresponds in a less clear, and probably more complicated fashion, with Earth's climate responses than earlier assumed, fueling broad avenues of new research in "the connection of the Sun and stratosphere, troposphere, biosphere, ocean, and Earth's climate".

== Surface illumination and spectrum ==
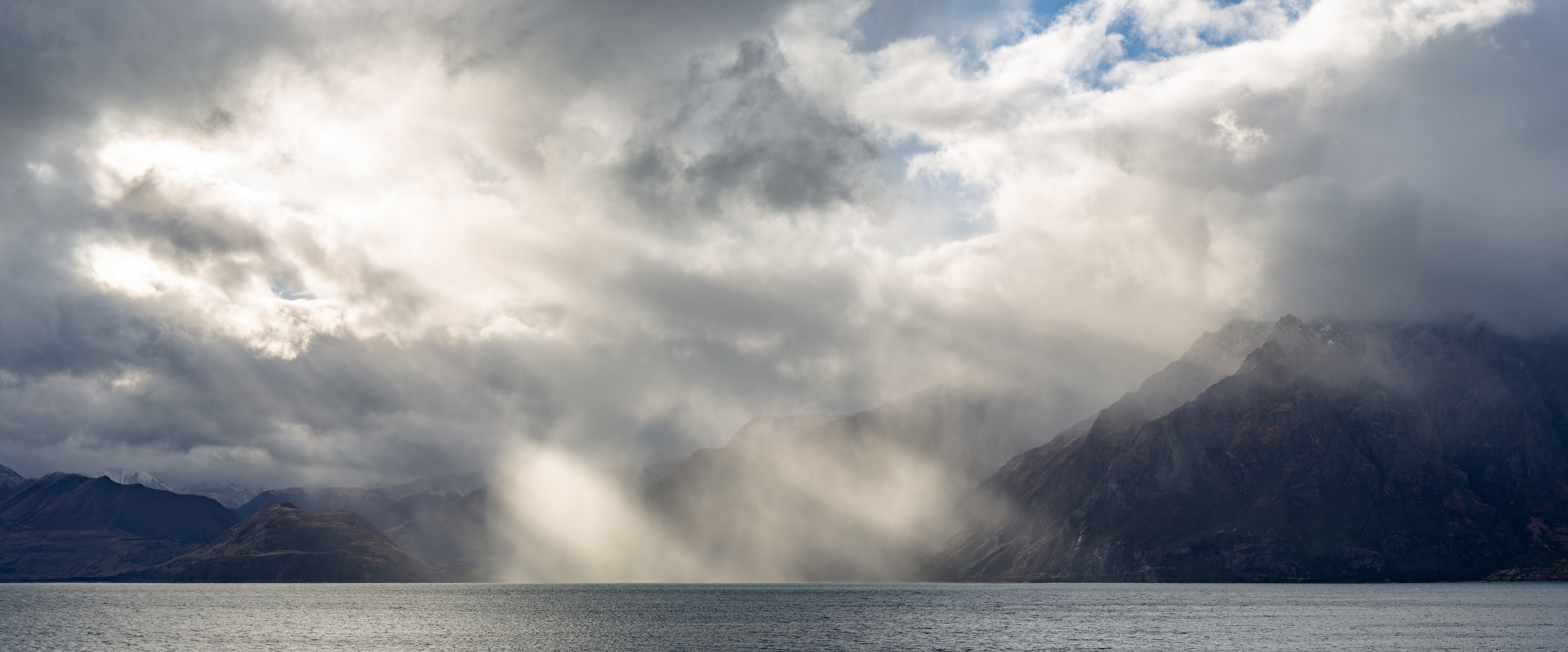
Sunlight shining through clouds, giving rise to crepuscular rays.

The spectrum of surface illumination depends upon solar elevation due to atmospheric effects, with the blue spectral component dominating during twilight before and after sunrise and sunset, respectively, and red dominating during sunrise and sunset. These effects are apparent in natural light photography where the principal source of illumination is sunlight as mediated by the atmosphere.

While the color of the sky is usually determined by Rayleigh scattering, an exception occurs at sunset and twilight. "Preferential absorption of sunlight by ozone over long horizon paths gives the zenith sky its blueness when the sun is near the horizon".

=== Spectral composition of sunlight at Earth's surface ===
The Sun may be said to illuminate, which is a measure of the light within a specific sensitivity range. Many animals (including humans) have a sensitivity range of approximately 400–700 nm, and given optimal conditions the absorption and scattering by Earth's atmosphere produces illumination that approximates an equal-energy illuminant for most of this range. The useful range for color vision in humans, for example, is approximately 450–650 nm. Aside from effects that arise at sunset and sunrise, the spectral composition changes primarily in respect to how directly sunlight is able to illuminate. When illumination is indirect, Rayleigh scattering in the upper atmosphere will lead blue wavelengths to dominate. Water vapour in the lower atmosphere produces further scattering and ozone, dust and water particles will also absorb particular wavelengths.

Spectrum of the visible wavelengths at approximately sea level; illumination by direct sunlight compared with direct sunlight scattered by cloud cover and with indirect sunlight by varying degrees of cloud cover. The yellow line shows the power spectrum of direct sunlight under optimal conditions. To aid comparison, the other illumination conditions are scaled by the factor shown in the key so they match at about 470 nm (blue light).

== Life on Earth ==
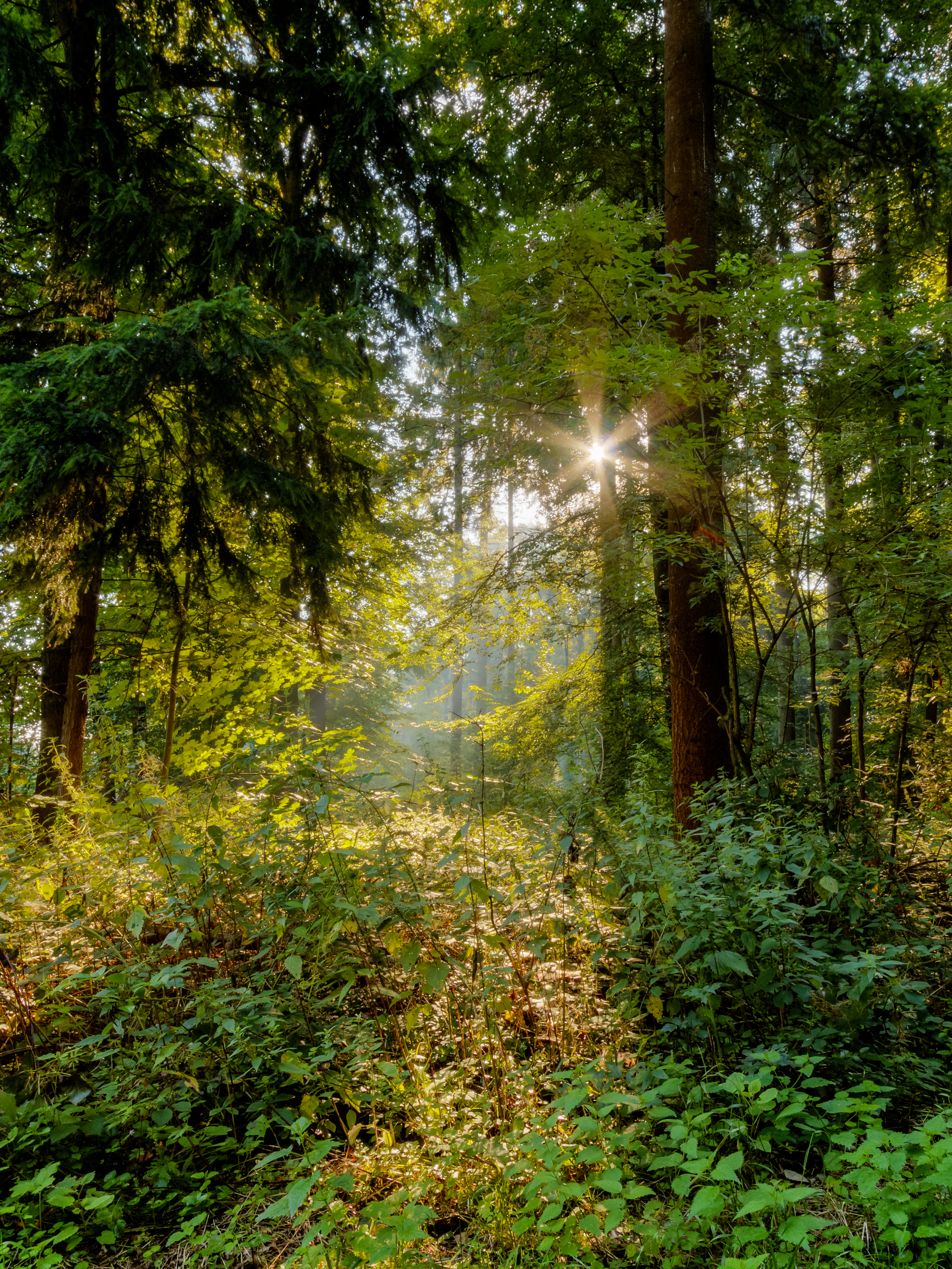
Sunlight penetrating through a forest canopy in Germany.

The existence of nearly all life on Earth is fueled by light from the Sun. Most autotrophs, such as plants, use the energy of sunlight, combined with carbon dioxide and water, to produce simple sugars—a process known as photosynthesis. These sugars are then used as building-blocks and in other synthetic pathways that allow the organism to grow.

Heterotrophs, such as animals, use light from the Sun indirectly by consuming the products of autotrophs, either by consuming autotrophs, by consuming their products, or by consuming other heterotrophs. The sugars and other molecular components produced by the autotrophs are then broken down, releasing stored solar energy, and giving the heterotroph the energy required for survival. This process is known as cellular respiration.

In prehistory, humans began to further extend this process by putting plant and animal materials to other uses. They used animal skins for warmth, for example, or wooden weapons to hunt. These skills allowed humans to harvest more of the sunlight than was possible through glycolysis alone, and human population began to grow.

During the Neolithic Revolution, the domestication of plants and animals further increased human access to solar energy. Fields devoted to crops were enriched by inedible plant matter, providing sugars and nutrients for future harvests. Animals that had previously provided humans with only meat and tools once they were killed were now used for labour throughout their lives, fueled by grasses inedible to humans. Fossil fuels are the remnants of ancient plant and animal matter, formed using energy from sunlight and then trapped within Earth for millions of years.

== Cultural aspects ==
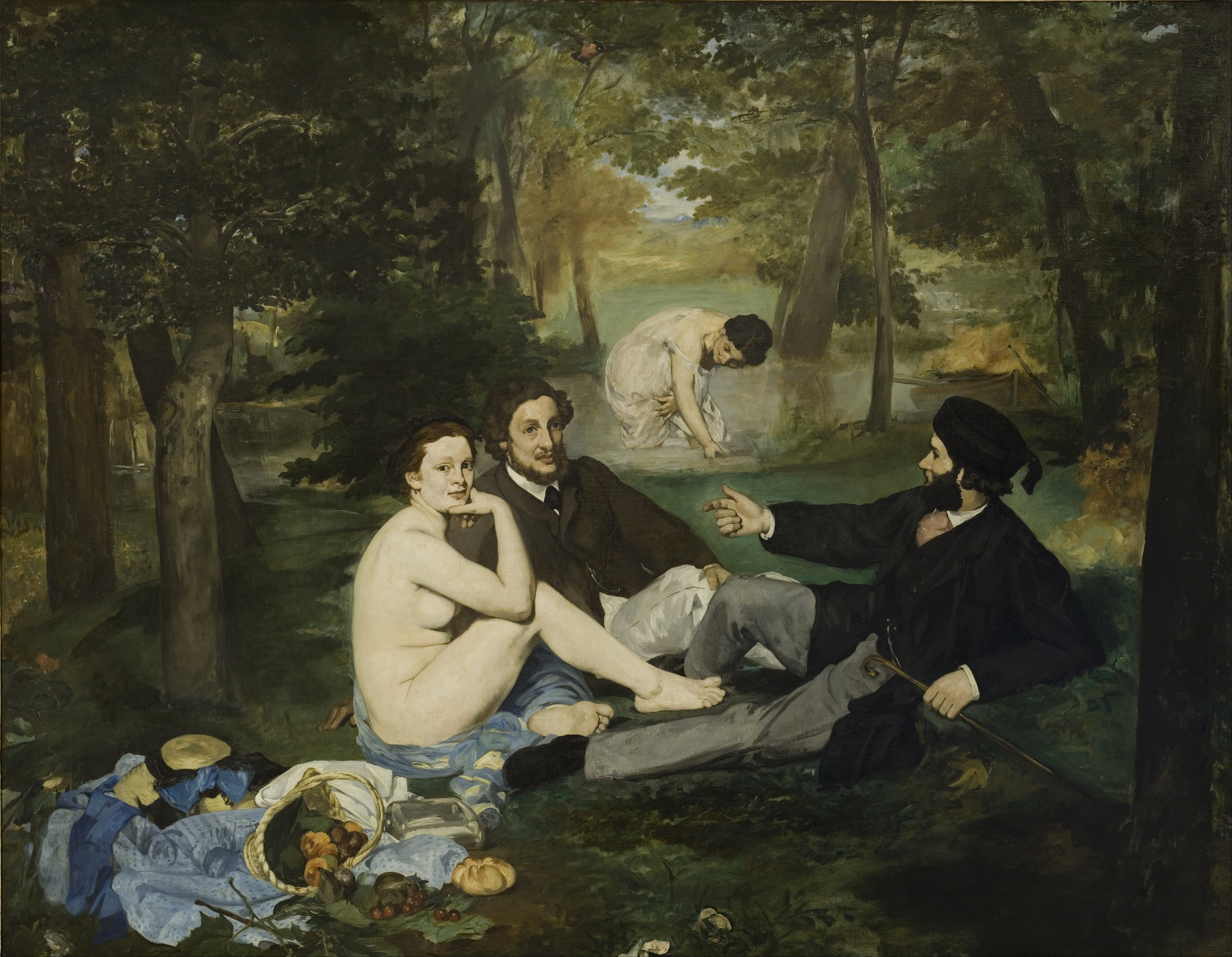
Édouard Manet: Le déjeuner sur l'herbe (1862–63).

The effect of sunlight is relevant to painting, evidenced for instance in works of Édouard Manet and Claude Monet on outdoor scenes and landscapes.

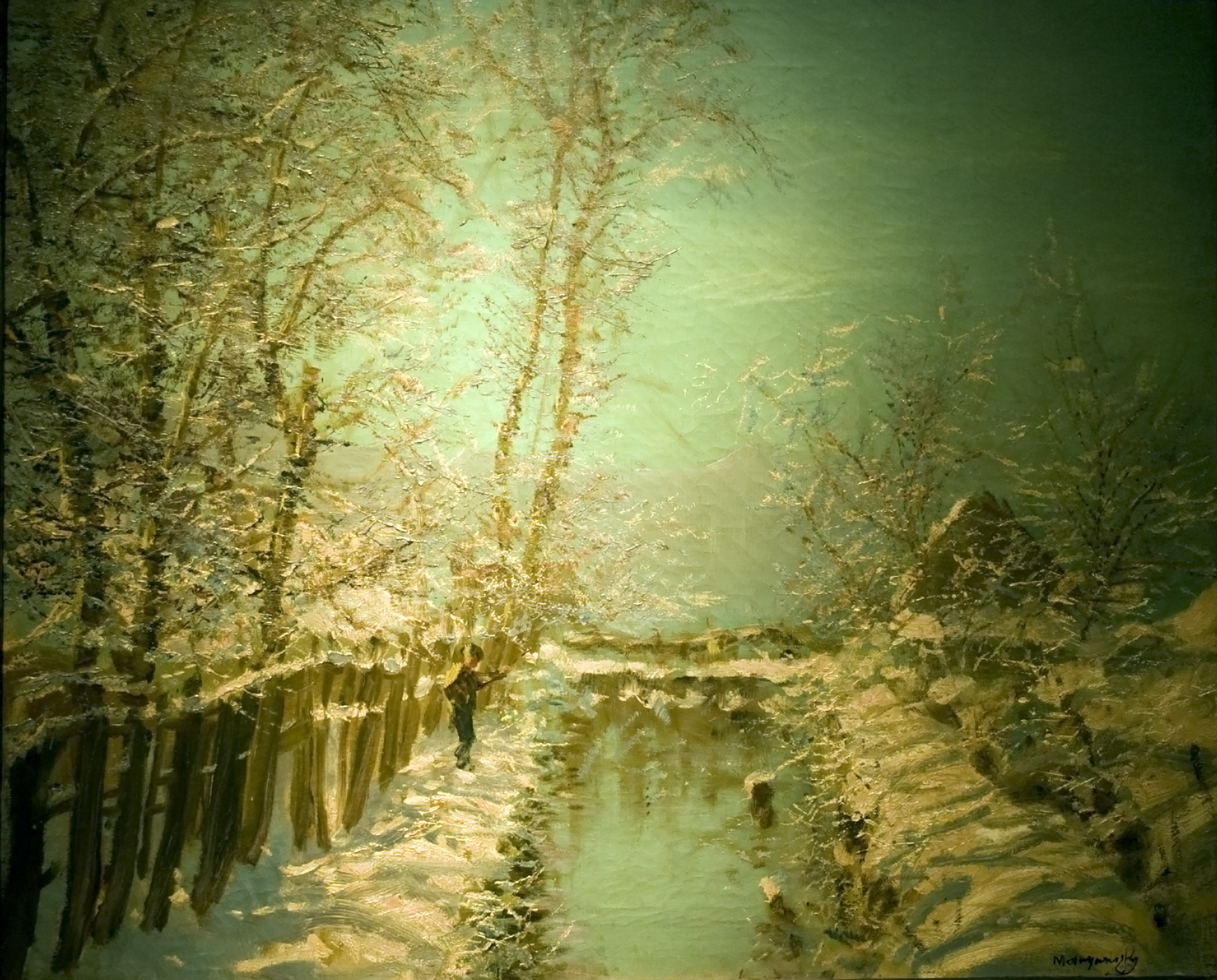
Téli verőfény ("Winter Sunshine") by László Mednyánszky, early 20th century.

Many people find direct sunlight to be too bright for comfort; indeed, looking directly at the Sun can cause long-term vision damage. To compensate for the brightness of sunlight, many people wear sunglasses. Cars, many helmets and caps are equipped with visors to block the Sun from direct vision when the Sun is at a low angle. Sunshine is often blocked from entering buildings through the use of walls, window blinds, awnings, shutters, curtains, or nearby shade trees. Sunshine exposure is needed biologically for the production of Vitamin D in the skin, a vital compound needed to make strong bone and muscle in the body.

In many world religions, such as Hinduism, the Sun is considered to be a god, as it is the source of life and energy on Earth. The Sun was also considered to be a god in Ancient Egypt.

=== Sunbathing ===
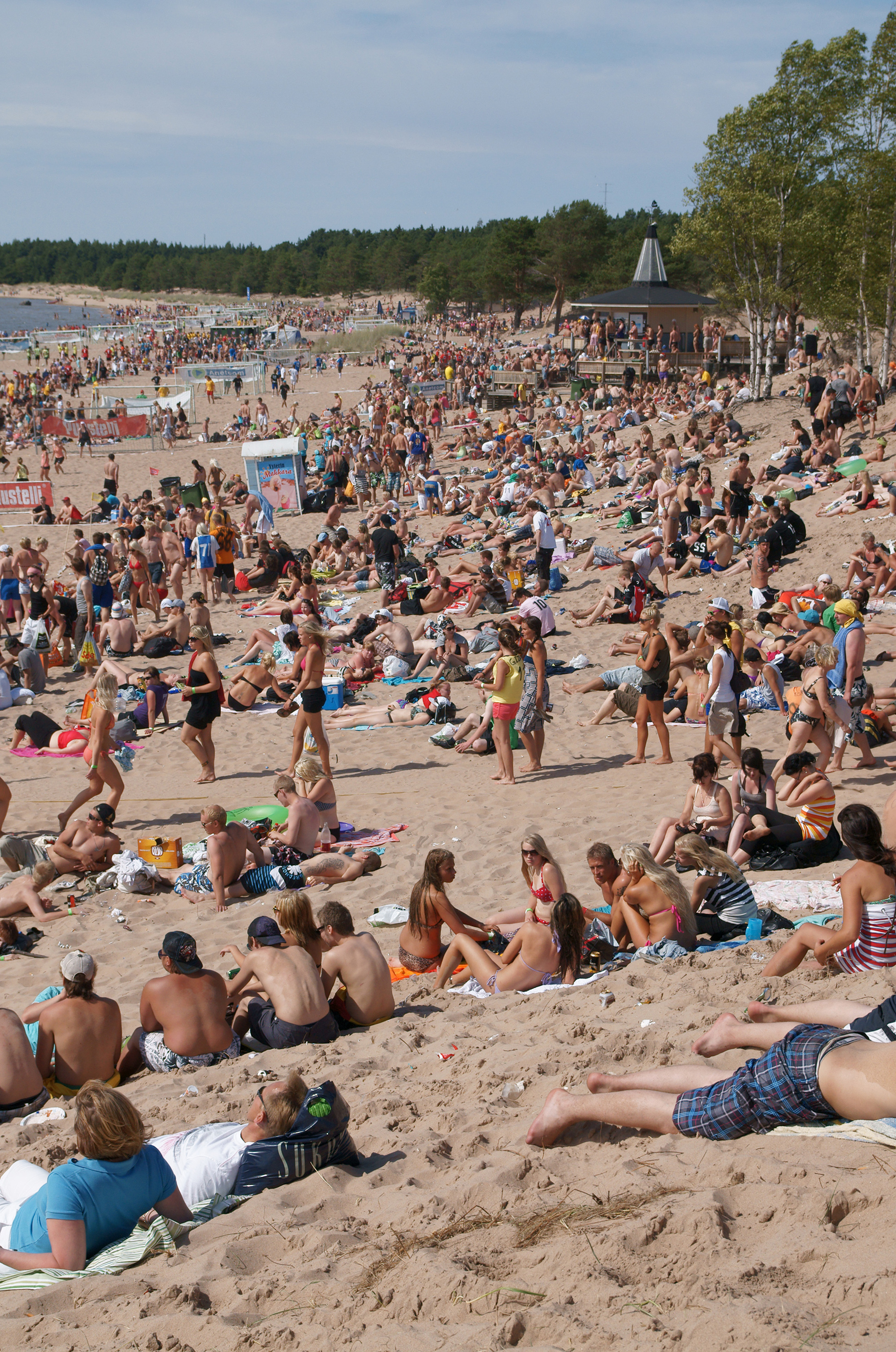
Sun bathers in Finland

Sunbathing is a popular leisure activity in which a person sits or lies in direct sunshine. People often sunbathe in comfortable places where there is ample sunlight. Some common places for sunbathing include beaches, open air swimming pools, parks, gardens, and sidewalk cafes. Sunbathers typically wear limited amounts of clothing or some simply go nude. For some, an alternative to sunbathing is the use of a sunbed that generates ultraviolet light and can be used indoors regardless of weather conditions. Tanning beds have been banned in a number of states in the world due to concerns of skin cancer.

For many people with light skin, one purpose for sunbathing is to darken one's skin color (get a sun tan), as this is considered in some cultures to be attractive, associated with outdoor activity, vacations/holidays, and health. Some people prefer naked sunbathing so that an "all-over" or "even" tan can be obtained, sometimes as part of a specific lifestyle.

Controlled heliotherapy, or sunbathing, has been used as a treatment for psoriasis and other maladies.

Skin tanning is achieved by an increase in the dark pigment inside skin cells called melanocytes, and is an automatic response mechanism of the body to sufficient exposure to ultraviolet radiation from the Sun or from artificial sunlamps. Thus, the tan gradually disappears with time, when one is no longer exposed to these sources.

== Effects on human health ==
The ultraviolet radiation in sunlight has both positive and negative health effects, as it is both a principal source of vitamin D_{3} and a mutagen. A dietary supplement can supply vitamin D without this mutagenic effect, but bypasses natural mechanisms that would prevent overdoses of vitamin D generated internally from sunlight. Vitamin D has a wide range of positive health effects, which include strengthening bones and possibly inhibiting the growth of some cancers. Sun exposure has also been associated with the timing of melatonin synthesis, maintenance of normal circadian rhythms, and reduced risk of seasonal affective disorder.

Insufficient sun exposure is responsible for 340,000 deaths in the United States and 480,000 deaths in Europe per year. Additionally, a lack of sun has an increased risk for breast cancer, colorectal cancer, hypertension, cardiovascular disease, metabolic syndrome, multiple sclerosis, Alzheimer’s disease, autism, asthma, type 1 diabetes and myopia.

Long-term sunlight exposure is known to be associated with the development of skin cancer, skin aging, immune suppression, and eye diseases such as cataracts and macular degeneration. Short-term overexposure is the cause of sunburn, snow blindness, and solar retinopathy.

UV rays, and therefore sunlight and sunlamps, are the only listed carcinogens that are known to have health benefits, and a number of public health organizations state that there needs to be a balance between the risks of having too much sunlight or too little. There is a general consensus that sunburn should always be avoided.

Epidemiological data shows that people who have more exposure to sunlight have less high blood pressure and cardiovascular-related mortality. While sunlight (and its UV rays) are a risk factor for skin cancer, "sun avoidance may carry more of a cost than benefit for over-all good health". A study found that there is no evidence that UV reduces lifespan in contrast to other risk factors like smoking, alcohol and high blood pressure.

== Effect on plant genomes ==
Elevated solar UV-B doses increase the frequency of DNA recombination in Arabidopsis thaliana and tobacco (Nicotiana tabacum) plants. These increases are accompanied by strong induction of an enzyme with a key role in recombinational repair of DNA damage. Thus the level of terrestrial solar UV-B radiation likely affects genome stability in plants.

== See also ==
- Color temperature
- Coronal radiative losses
- Diathermancy
- Fraunhofer lines
- List of cities by sunshine duration
- Moonlight
- Light pollution
- Photic sneeze reflex
- Photosynthesis
- Solar energy
- Starlight
- Sunbeam – Light rays appearing to radiate from the Sun
