= Delta E effect =

Magnetomechanical effect

The Delta E (ΔE) effect is a magnetomechanical effect. The name refers to changes in the effective elastic moduli of a magnetostrictive material, particularly the Young's modulus E, when a magnetic field is applied to a material.

This effect is connected to the tendency of a previously bent rod, made of magnetostrictive material, to straighten when subjected to a magnetic field applied along the rod's axis. This macroscopic effect is sometimes called the Guillemin effect, attributed to Claude-Marie Guillemin who first discussed the effect in 1846. The first explanations to the ΔE effect were given in the 1930s.

== Description ==
The ΔE effect is often just considered in terms of a change of the effective Young modulus of a material under the application of a magnetic field. It is a consequence of the geometry and magnetic anisotropy of the magnetic domains. The Young's modulus changes from zero field to saturation. The change in theYoung's modulus ΔE is written as

$\Delta E = \frac{E_{\mathrm s}-E_0}{E_0},$

where $E_{\mathrm s}$ is the Young modulus at saturation and $E_{0}$ is the Young modulus in the unsaturated state. The effect is more general than this, and leads to changes in the values of all components of the elastic modulus tensor in a magnetic field.

== Applications ==
The ΔE effect is used in applications to build actuators and sensors.

== See also ==
- Magnetomechanical effects
- Magnetostriction
- Magnetocrystalline anisotropy
