= Diathermancy =

Property of certain fluids

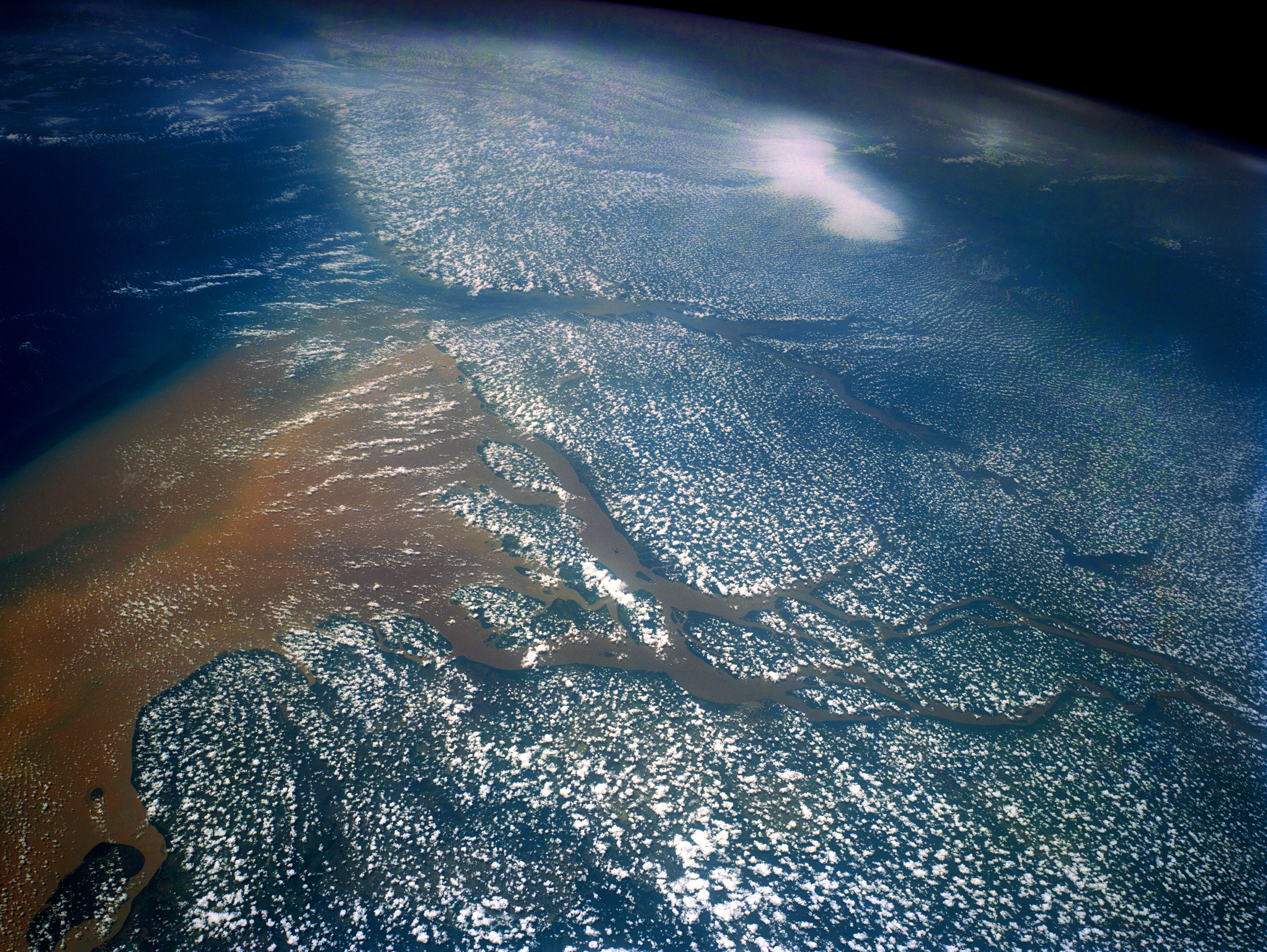
The Amazon River delta showing no clouds above river waters because water is not a diathermanous fluid.

Diathermancy (from "dia" through and "thermē" heat) is the property of some fluids that allows rays of light through them without itself being heated. A diathermanous substance is thus "permeable" by heat. Diathermancy was first described by German physicist and chemist Heinrich Gustav Magnus in the 1800s.

Air is diathermanous; therefore atmospheric air is not heated by sunshine. Atmospheric air is heated by long-wave thermal radiation emitted by soil, and especially, by water on the Earth's surface.

Water is not diathermanous, and it is heated directly by sunshine.

== Atmospheric heating from oceanic waters ==
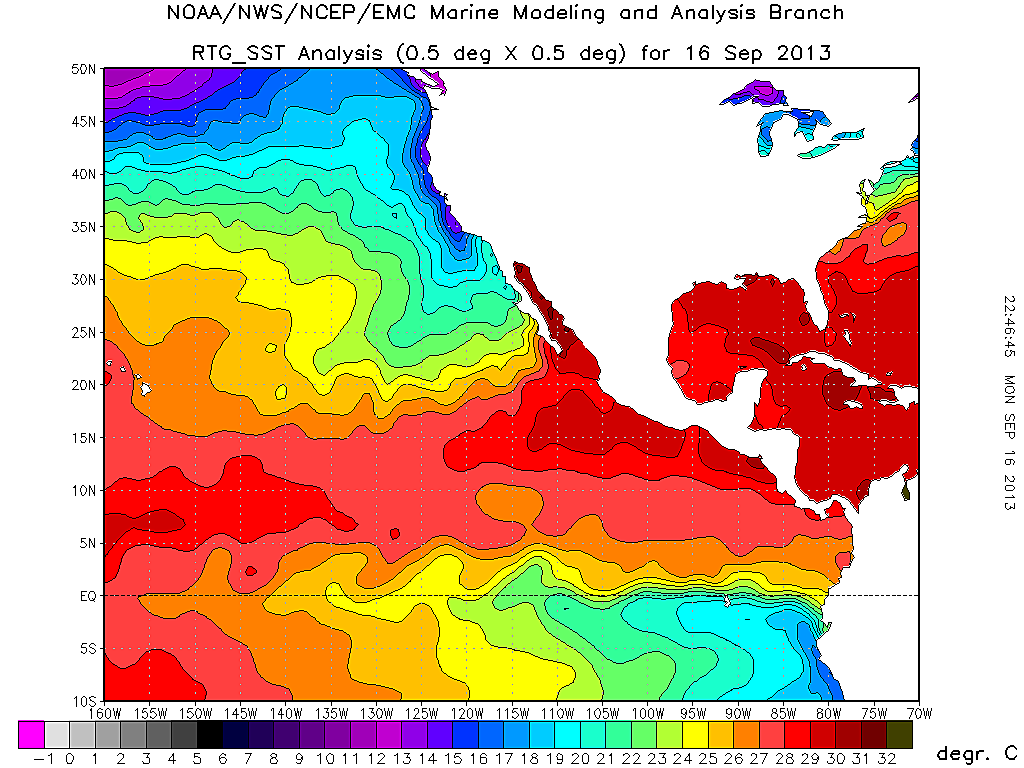
Northeastern Pacific Ocean Surface Water Temperature

Atmospheric heat comes from long-wave radiation from the soil and, mostly, from the water surface (oceans, lakes, rivers), because water is a not diathermanous body and covers three quarters of Earth's surface. Diathermancy cause subsidence above damp or water surfaces. That is because these areas tend to absorb heat radiation directly from the Sun but very slowly and also emit this radiation to the atmosphere very slowly. Therefore, cold ocean currents have very clear skies, without clouds, because subsidence from cold and heavy air avoids or limits convection because they are opposite processes.

== See also ==
- Greenhouse effect
- Outgoing longwave radiation
