= Alfred Wiedemann =

German Egyptologist (1856–1936)

- Born: 18 July 1856; Berlin, Prussia
- Died: 7 December 1936 (aged 80); Bad Godesberg, Nazi Germany
- Parent: Gustav Wiedemann

Academic background
- Education: Leipzig University (PhD)

Academic work
- Discipline: Egyptology
- Institutions: University of Bonn

Alfred Wiedemann (18 July 1856 – 7 December 1936) was a German Egyptologist. He was the son of physicist Gustav Heinrich Wiedemann and the younger brother of physicist Eilhard Wiedemann. He was a son-in-law to psychiatrist Carl Maria Finkelnburg (1832–1896).

He studied Egyptology and classical history at the Universities of Leipzig, Berlin, Paris, and Tübingen, obtaining his PhD in October 1878 at Leipzig. In 1882, he became habilitated for Egyptology and ancient Near Eastern history at the University of Bonn. In 1891 he became an associate professor at Bonn, where from 1920 to 1924, he served as a full professor.

In 1926, the thoroughfare Wiedemannstraße in the Bad Godesberg district of Bonn was named in this honor.

== Published works ==
He was the author of works that encompassed many aspects associated with ancient Egypt, including books dealing with subjects such as religion, the afterlife, occult practices, myths and fairy tales, etc. A few of his works were later translated and published in English:

- "The ancient Egyptian doctrine of the immortality of the soul", 1895.
- "Religion of the ancient Egyptians", 1897.
- "The realms of the Egyptian dead, according to the belief of the ancient Egyptians", 1901.
- "Popular literature in ancient Egypt", 1902.

Books by Wiedemann with German titles

- Ägyptische Geschichte, 1884 – Egyptian history.
- Die religion der alten Ägypter, 1890 – Religion of ancient Egypt.
- Herodots zweites Buch mit sachlichen Erlaüterungen, 1890 – Herodotus' second book with explanatory notes.
- Die Toten und ihre Reiche im Glauben der alten Ägypter, 1900 – The realms of the dead according to beliefs of the ancient Egyptians.
- Die unterhaltungslitteratur der alten Ägypter, 1902 – Popular literature in ancient Egypt.
- Magie und zauberei im alten Ägypten, 1905 – Magic and sorcery of ancient Egypt.
- Altägyptische Sagen und Märchen, 1906 – Ancient Egyptian legends and fairy tales.
- Der Tierkult der alten Ägypter, 1912 – The animal cult of ancient Egypt.
