= Eilhard Wiedemann =

Eilhard Ernst Gustav Wiedemann (1 August 1852, in Berlin – 7 January 1928, in Erlangen) was a German physicist and historian of science. He was the son of physicist Gustav Heinrich Wiedemann (1826–1899), and an older brother to Egyptologist Alfred Wiedemann (1856–1936).

He studied physics at the Universities of Heidelberg and Leipzig, obtaining his doctorate in 1872 with the thesis "Über die elliptische Polarisation und ihre Beziehung zu den Oberflächenfarben der Körper (On the elliptical polarization of light and its relation to surface color). From 1878 to 1886, he was an associate professor of physics at Leipzig, afterwards relocating to the University of Erlangen as a full professor (1886–1926).

The term luminescence was first introduced by Wiedemann in 1888.

In addition to his duties as a physicist, he was a prolific author of works involving "history of science" themes, in particular, science as it pertained to Arab traditions.

== Selected publications ==
- Physikalisches Praktikum. Mit besonderer Berücksichtigung der physikalisch-chemischen Methoden, Braunschweig (with Hermann Ebert), 1890 - Practical physics, with special emphasis on physical-chemical methods.
- Über die Naturwissenschaften bei den Arabern, Hamburg 1890 - On Arab natural sciences.
- Das neue Physikalische Institut der Universität Erlangen, 1896 - On the new institute of physics at the University of Erlangen.
- Über Trinkgefäße und Tafelaufsätze nach al-Gazarî und den Benu Mûsà, Straßburg 1918.
- Zur Alchemie bei den Arabern, Erlangen 1922 - On Arab alchemy.
- Aufsätze zur arabischen Wissenschaftsgeschichte, with Wolf Dietrich Fischer. Hildesheim, New York, G. Olms, 1970 - Essays on the Arab history of science.
- Gesammelte Schriften zur arabisch-islamischen Wissenschaftsgeschichte, with Dorothea Girke; Frankfurt am Main : Institut für Geschichte der Arabisch-Islamischen Wissenschaften an der Johann Wolfgang Goethe-Universität, 1984 - Collected writings on Arab-Islamic science history.

== See also ==
- Physical crystallography before X-rays
