= Subsidence (atmosphere) =

Movement of colder, more dense air downwards within the atmosphere

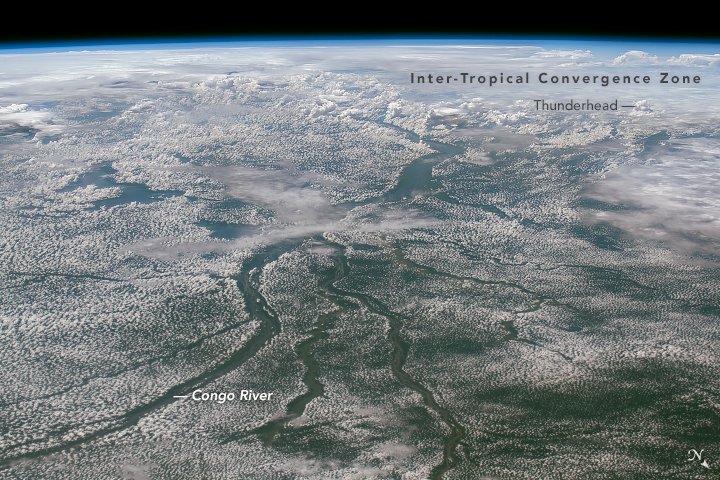
Subsidence above the Congo River Basin including the Congo River and some tributaries. Note the lack of clouds above the rivers due to subsidence of colder air which precludes convection, convection being the inverse process to subsidence. Source: NASA

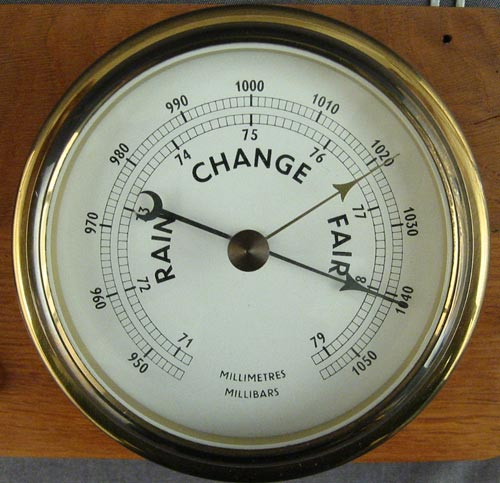
Dosen barometer showing different kinds of weather, according to atmospheric pressure, being high pressure an indication of fair weather because of atmospheric subsidence, and being rapidly diminishing pressure, a sign to a bad weather system approaching.

In meteorology, subsidence is the downward movement of an air parcel as it cools and becomes denser. By contrast, warm air becomes less dense and moves upwards (atmospheric convection).

Atmospheric subsidence generally creates a high-pressure area as more air moves into the same space: the polar highs are areas of almost constant subsidence, as are the horse latitudes, and the areas of subsidence are the sources of much of the prevailing winds in the Earth's atmosphere.

Subsidence also causes many smaller-scale weather phenomena, such as morning fog; on the other hand, its absence may cause air stagnation. An extreme form of subsidence is a downburst, which can result in damage similar to that produced by a tornado. A milder form of subsidence is referred to as downdraft.

== Atmospheric pressure and atmospheric subsidence ==
The Dosen barometer (pictured) clearly relates high pressure with fine weather, as seen in its dial. This is because high pressure zones are subsidence zones, with dry and cool air descending and, therefore, clear skies and good weather.

== See also ==
- Diathermancy
- Convection
