= Carlo Matteucci =

Italian politician and physicist (1811–1868)

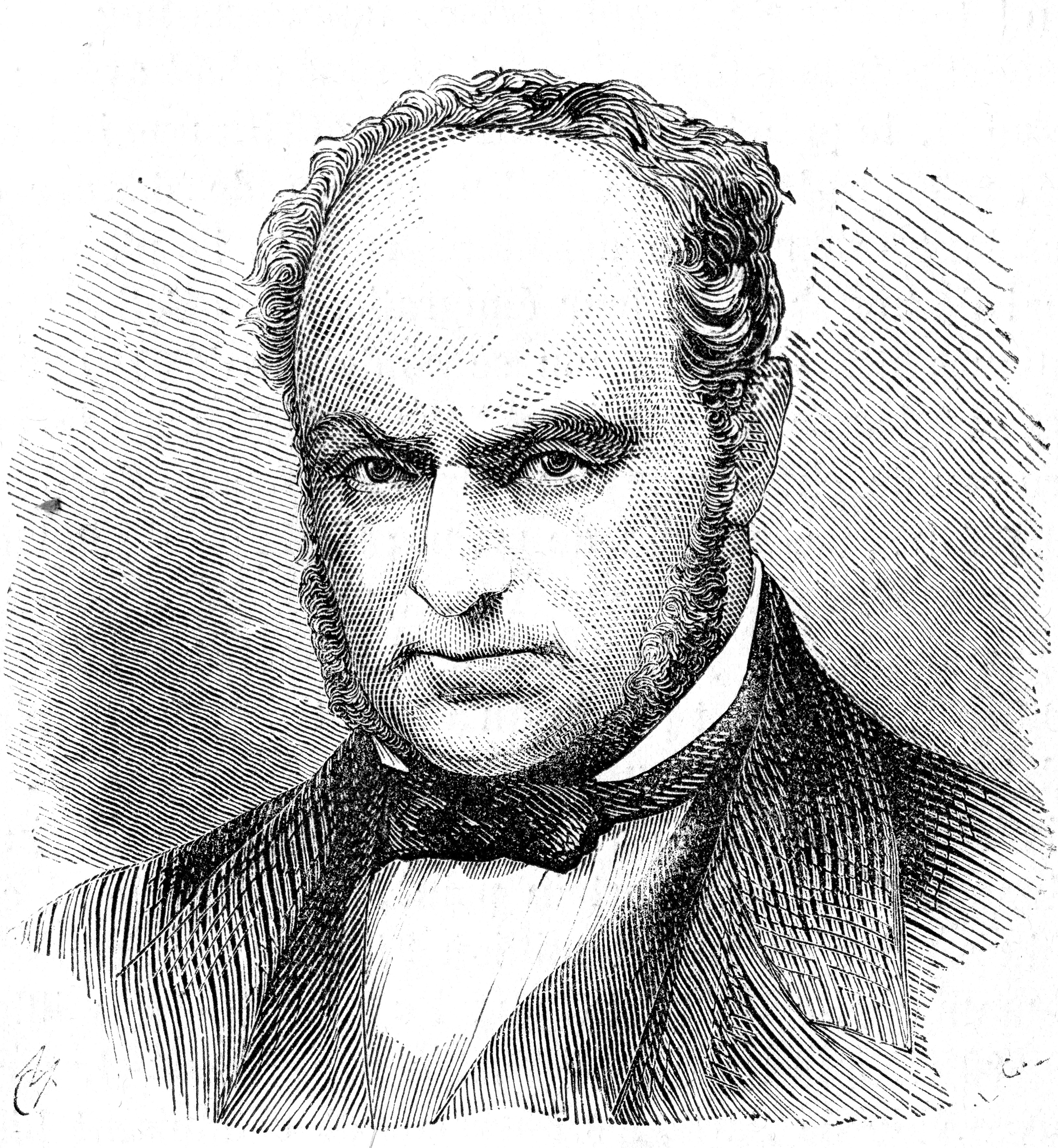
- Born: 20 June 1811; Forlì, Papal States
- Died: 24 June 1868 (aged 57); Livorno, Tuscany, Kingdom of Italy
- Education: University of Bologna (PhD) (1829)
- Known for: Matteucci effect
- Awards: Copley Medal (1844)
- Scientific career
- Fields: Physics; Neurophysiology
- Workplaces: University of Pisa

President of the Accademia nazionale delle scienze
- In office 2 September 1866 – 24 May 1868
- Preceded by: Stefano Marianini
- Succeeded by: Francesco Brioschi

Carlo Matteucci (20 June 1811 – 24 June 1868) was an Italian physicist and neurophysiologist who was a pioneer in the study of bioelectricity.

== Biography ==
Carlo Matteucci was born at Forlì, in the province of Romagna, to Vincenzo Matteucci, a physician, and Chiara Folfi. He studied mathematics at the University of Bologna from 1825 to 1828, receiving his doctorate in 1829. From 1829 to 1831, he studied at the École Polytechnique in Paris, France. Upon returning to Italy, Matteucci studied at Bologna (1832), Florence, Ravenna (1837) and Pisa. He established himself as the head of the laboratory of the Hospital of Ravenna and became a professor of physics at the local college. In 1840, by recommendation of François Arago (1786–1853), his teacher at the École Polytechnique, to the Grand-Duke of Tuscany, Matteucci accepted a post of professor of physics at the University of Pisa.

Instigated by the work of Luigi Galvani (1737–1798) on bioelectricity, Matteucci began in 1830 a series of experiments which he pursued until his death in 1865. Using a sensitive galvanometer of Leopoldo Nobili, he was able to prove that injured excitable biological tissues generated direct electrical currents, and that they could be summed up by adding elements in series, like in Alessandro Volta’s (1745-1827) electric pile. Thus, Mateucci was able to develop what he called a "rheoscopic frog", by using the cut nerve of a frog's leg and its attached muscle as a kind of sensitive electricity detector. His work in bioelectricity influenced directly the research developed by Emil du Bois-Reymond (1818–1896), a student of the great German biologist Johannes Peter Müller (1801–1858) in Berlin, who tried the duplicate Matteucci's experiments and ended up discovering the nerve's action potential. In 1844, for these studies, Matteucci was awarded with the Copley medal by the Royal Society.

From 1847, he took an active part in politics, and in 1860 was chosen an Italian senator, at the same time becoming inspector-general of the Italian telegraph lines. Two years later he was appointed Minister of Education.

== Personal life ==
On 7 September 1846, Matteucci married Robinia Elizabeth Young (c. 1811–1897) at Marylebone Church in London. Robinia was the adopted daughter of Mary Ancrum Young (c. 1790–1867), widow of Rev. Robert Young, D.D., minister of the Scots Church, London Wall. Mary Young is buried in the English Cemetery, Florence, where her tomb bears a dedicatory inscription from Carlo and Robinia Matteucci.

Matteucci died at Ardenza, near Livorno, on 24 June 1868.

== Works ==
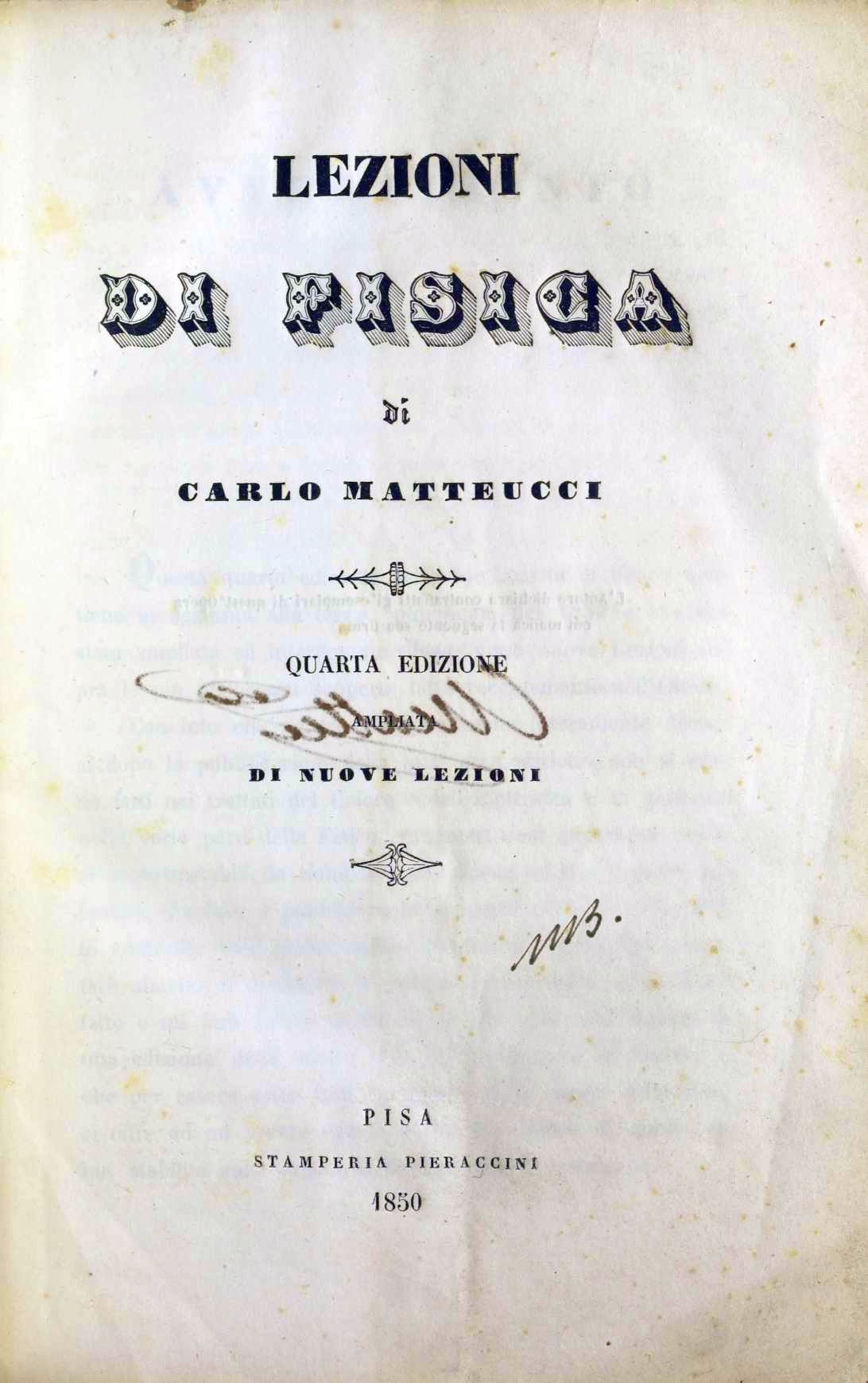
Lezioni di fisica, 1850

Matteucci was the author of four scientific treatises in physics:

- Lezioni di fisica (2 vols., Pisa, 1841)
- Lezioni sui fenomeni fisico-chimici dei corpi viventi (Pisa, 1844)
- Manuale di telegrafia electrica (Pisa, 1850)
- Cours spécial sur l'induction, le magnétisme de rotation, etc. (Paris, 1854).
- Trattato dei fenomeni elettrofisiologici degli animali (1844)
- Lezioni di fisica [Physics lessons] (in Italian). Pisa: Pieraccini. 1850.
- Corso di elettrofisiologia (1857)
- Corso di elettro-fisiologia [Course in Electro-physiology] (in Italian). Torino: Castellazzo e Vercellino. 1861.

His numerous papers were published in the Annales de chimie et de physique (1829–1858); and most of them also appeared at the time in the Italian scientific journals. They relate almost entirely to electrical phenomena, such as the magnetic rotation of light, the action of gas batteries, the effects of torsion on magnetism, the electric polarization of electrodes, etc., sufficiently complete accounts of which are given in Wiedemann's Galvanismus.

Nine memoirs, entitled Electro-Physiological Researches, were published in the Philosophical Transactions, 1845–1860. See Bianchi's Carlo Matteucci e l’Italia del suo tempo (Rome, 1874).

== See also ==
- Matteucci effect
- Matteucci Medal
- Physical crystallography before X-rays

== Bibliography ==
- Matteucci, C. (1842). "Sur un phenomene physiologique produit par les muscles en contraction". Annales de chimie et de physique. 6: 339–341.
- Farnetani, Francesca; Monsagrati, Giuseppe (2008). "MATTEUCCI, Carlo". Dizionario Biografico degli Italiani (in Italian). Vol. 72: Massimo–Mechetti. Rome: Istituto dell'Enciclopedia Italiana. ISBN 978-88-12-00032-6.
