= Hagenbach (river) =

River in Germany

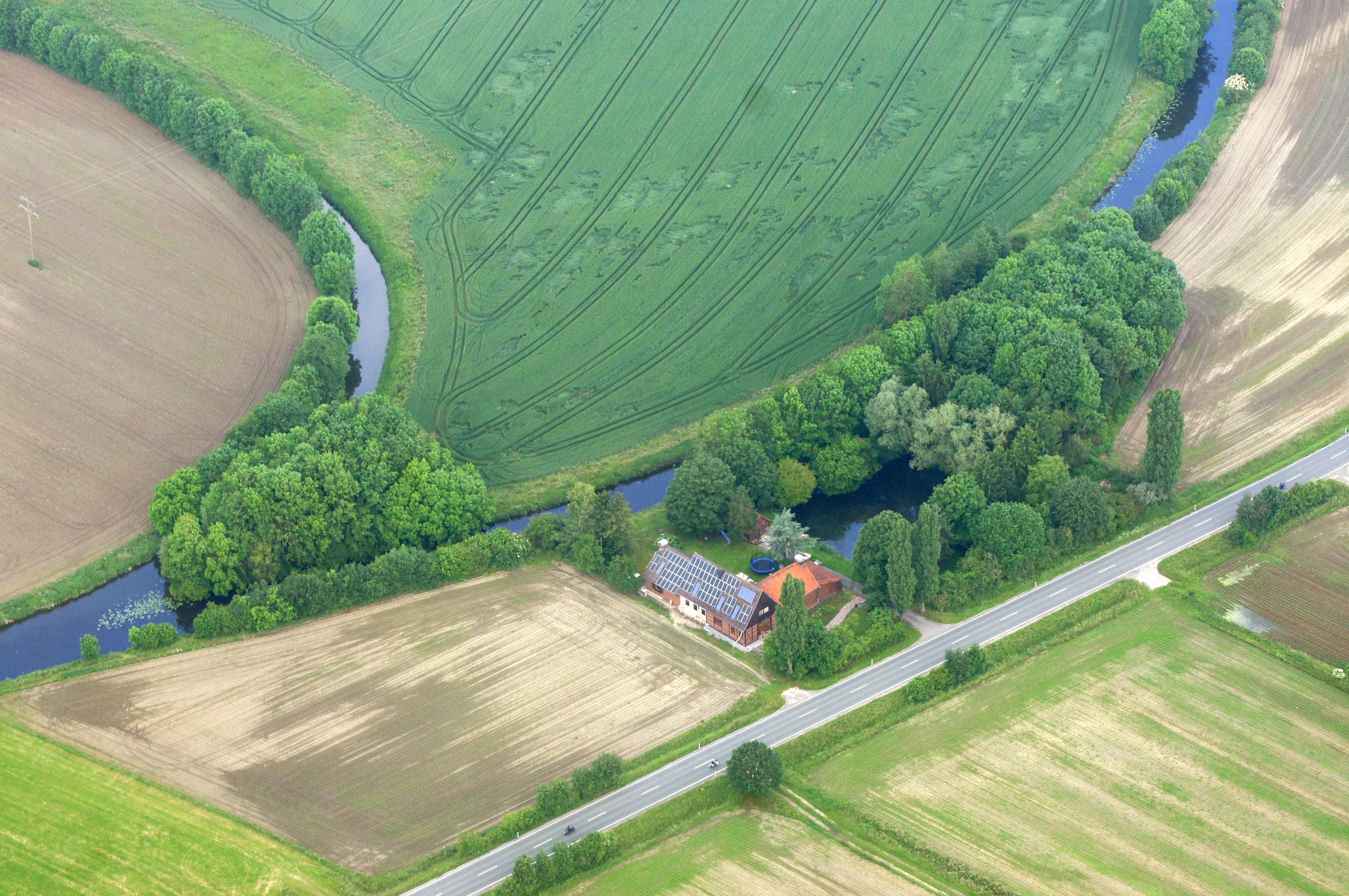

Location
- Country: Germany
- States: North Rhine-Westphalia

Physical characteristics
- Mouth
  - location: Kleuterbach
  - coordinates: 51.8653°N 7.3581°E

Basin features
- Progression: Kleuterbach→ Stever→ Lippe→ Rhine→ North Sea

Hagenbach is a small river of North Rhine-Westphalia, Germany. It flows into the Kleuterbach in Dülmen-Buldern.

== Similar rivers by name ==
There are ten other rivers and streams in North Rhine-Westphalia named Hagenbach, of which two are tributaries of the Lippe.

== See also ==
- List of rivers of North Rhine-Westphalia
