= Matteucci effect =

Magnetomechanical effect

The Matteucci effect is the creation of a helical anisotropy of the magnetic susceptibility of a magnetostrictive material when subjected to a torque. It is one of the magnetomechanical effects, which is thermodynamically inverse to Wiedemann effect. This effect was described by Carlo Matteucci in 1858. It is observable in amorphous wires with helical domain structure, which can be obtained by twisting the wire, or annealing under twist. The effect is most distinct in the so-called 'dwarven alloys' (called so because of the historical cobalt element etymology), with cobalt as main substituent.

== See also ==
- Magnetostriction
- Magnetocrystalline anisotropy
