= August Hagenbach =

Swiss physicist (1871–1955)

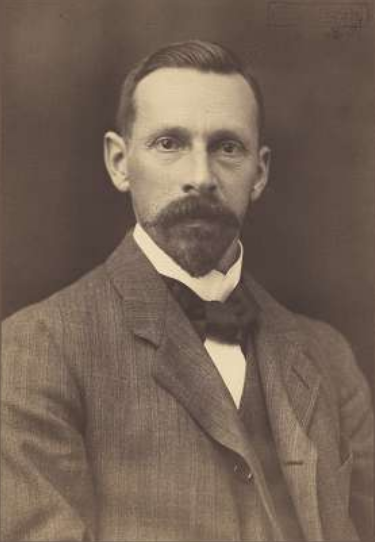
Hagenbach in 1910.

August Hagenbach (22 December 1871 – 11 August 1955) was a Swiss physicist working in spectroscopy.

He was the son of physicist Eduard Hagenbach-Bischoff and obtained his Ph.D. in 1894 at the University of Leipzig with a thesis titled "Über Thermoelemente aus Metallen und Salzlösungen" under the supervision of Gustav Heinrich Wiedemann.

In 1906, he took over the chaired professorship at the University of Basel earlier held by his father.

In 1926, he was rector of the University of Basel.

One of his students was Ernst Stueckelberg.
