= Matteo Salvucci =

Italian painter

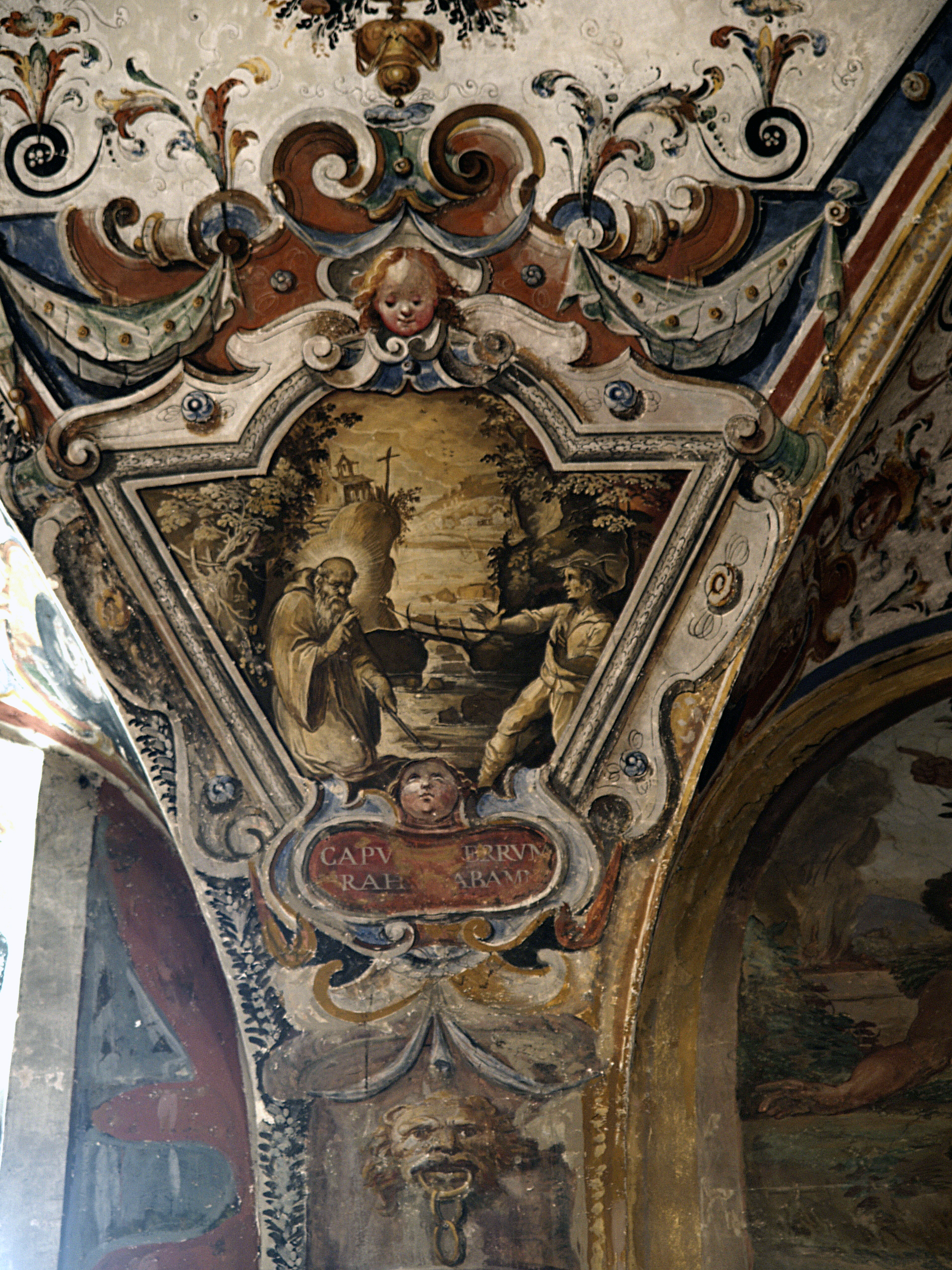
Oratorio San Benedetto, Perugia

Matteo or Matteucci or Mattiuccio Salvucci (1576–1628) was an Italian painter, active in Perugia in a Mannerist style. He is said by some a pupil of Federico Barocci. He apparently traveled to Rome, but failed to gain continued patronage. Lupattelli describes him as not having any one master. He is said to have painted the main altarpiece of Christ in Glory with Saint Benedict and Scolatica (1608) for the church of Santa Maria Maddalena in Perugia. He painted canvases for the choir of San Ercolano : The testimony of San Ercolano, his Martyrdom, and the Transfer of his Relics. For the Sacristy of San Fiorenzo, he painted some lunettes in 1612. He painted grotteschi on the ceiling of the church of the Confraternity of San Benedetto with figures and stories in chiaroscuro. In Santa Maria Nuova, he also painted ceiling grotteschi.
