= Adolf Wüllner =

German physicist

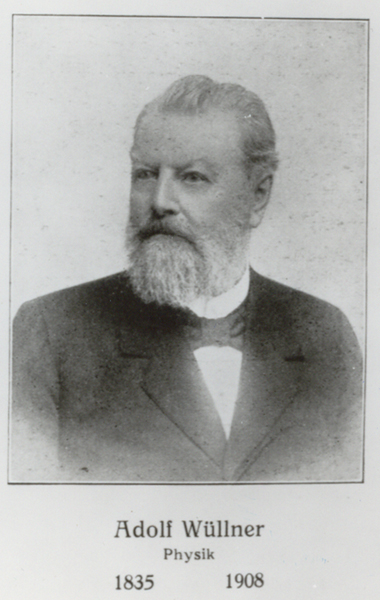
Adolf Wüllner

Adolf Wüllner (13 June 1835, in Düsseldorf – 6 October 1908, in Aachen) was a German physicist.

He studied physics at the University of Bonn, the Ludwig-Maximilians-Universität München, and the Friedrich Wilhelm University of Berlin, qualifying as a lecturer at Marburg University in 1858. In 1862, he became director of the vocational school in Aachen, and three years later taught classes in physics at the Poppelsdorf agricultural academy. In 1867, he was named an associate professor at the University of Bonn, and from 1869 onward, was a professor of physics at the Technical University of Aachen. From 1883 to 86, he served as academic rector.

He is remembered for his work on the specific heat of liquids and gases, vapor tension, refractive indexes and emission spectra.

== Published works ==
He was the author of a successful textbook on experimental physics that was published over several editions:

- Lehrbuch der Experimentalphysik (2 volumes 1862–65; 5th edition, 4 volumes 1907):
  - Vol. 1: Allgemeine Physik und Akustik – General physics and acoustics.
  - Vol. 2: Die Lehre von der Wärme – On heat.
  - Vol. 3: Die Lehre vom Magnetismus und von der Elektricität – On magnetism and electricity.
  - Vol, 4: Die Lehre von der Strahlung – On radiation.

Other noted works of his include:

- Ueber den Einfluss des Procentgehaltes auf die Spannkraft der Dämpfe aus wässerigen Salzlösungen (inaugural dissertation, 1856).
- Die Absorption des Lichtes in isotropen Mitteln, 1862 – Absorption of light in isotropic agents.
- Einleitung in die Dioptrik des Auges, 1866 – Introduction to the dioptrics of the eye.
- Die Entwicklung der Grundanschauungen in der Physik im Laufe unseres Jahrhunderts, 1887 – The development of the fundamental principles in physics during the course of our century.

He was also the author of many scientific papers in the journal Annalen der Physik und Chemie.
