= Karl Rudolf Hagenbach =

Swiss theologian and historian (1801–1874)

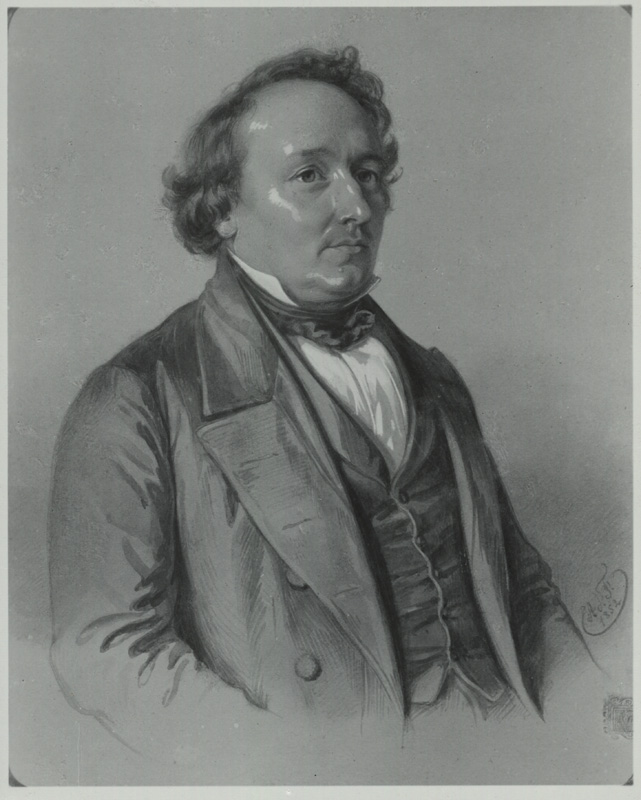
Karl Rudolf Hagenbach

Karl Rudolf Hagenbach (March 4, 1801 – June 7, 1874) was a Swiss Protestant theologian and historian. He was particularly interested in the Protestant Reformation and its figures.

== Life ==
Hagenbach was born at Basel, where his father was a practising physician, and a professor of anatomy and botany in the university. His preliminary education was at a Pestalozzian school, and afterwards at the gymnasium, whence in due course he passed to the newly reorganized local university. He early devoted himself to theological studies and the service of the church, while at the same time cherishing and developing broad "humanistic" tendencies which found expression in many ways and especially in an enthusiastic admiration for the writings of Johann Gottfried von Herder.

The years 1820–1823 were spent first at Bonn, where Gottfried Christian Friedrich Lücke (1791–1855) exerted a powerful influence on his thought, and afterwards at Berlin, where Friedrich Daniel Ernst Schleiermacher and Johann August Wilhelm Neander became his masters. Returning in 1823 to Basel, where W. M. L. de Wette had recently been appointed to a theological chair, he distinguished himself greatly by his trial dissertation Observationes historico-hermeneuticae circa Origenis methodum interpretendae sacrae Scripturae; in 1824 he became professor extraordinarius, and in 1829 professor ordinarius of theology.

Apart from his academic labours in connection with the history of dogma and of the church, he lived a life of great and varied usefulness as a theologian, a preacher and a citizen; and at his jubilee in 1873, not only the university and town of Basel but also the various churches of Switzerland united to do him honour. He died at Basel on 7 June 1874.

== Works ==
Hagenbach was a voluminous author, distinguished as a writer on church history. Though neither so learned and condensed as the contributions of Gieseler, nor so original and profound as those of Neander, his lectures are clear, attractive and free from narrow sectarian prejudice. In dogmatics, while avowedly a champion of the mediation theology (German: Vermittlungstheologie), based upon the fundamental conceptions of Herder and Schleiermacher, he was much less revolutionary than were many others of his school. He sought to maintain the old confessional documents, and to make the objective prevail over the purely subjective manner of viewing theological questions. But he himself was aware that in the endeavour to do so he was not always successful, and that his delineations of Christian dogma often betrayed a vacillating and uncertain hand.

His works include:

- Tabellarische Übersicht der Dogmengeschichte (Tabular Overview of the History of Dogma, 1828).
- Encyclopädie und Methodologie der theologische Wissenschaften (1833/1889; translated into English as Theological Encyclopedia and Methodology, 1884/1891).
- Vorlesungen über Wesen und Geschichte der Reformation und des Protestantismus (Lectures on the Nature and History of the Reformation and of Protestantism, 1834–1843; vol. 1–2; vol. 3; vol. 4; translated into English as History of the Reformation in Germany and Switzerland Chiefly, vol. 1, 1878; vol. 2, 1879).
- Lehrbuch der Dogmengeschichte (1840–1841, 5th edition, 1867; translated into English as A Text-book on the History of Dogma, , vol. 1, 1850, vol. 2, 1861).
- Die Kirchengeschichte des 18. und 19. Jahrhunderts: Aus dem Standpunkte des evangelischen Protestantismus (History of the Church in the Eighteenth and Nineteenth Centuries: From the Standpoint of Evangelical Protestantism, Part I, 1848; English translation: vol. 1, 1870; vol. 2, 1870).
- Vorlesungen über die Geschichte der alten Kirche (Lectures on the History of the Ancient Church, 1853–1855).
- Vorlesungen über die Kirchengeschichte des Mittelalters (Lectures on the History of the Medieval Church, 1860–1861).
- German Rationalism, in its Rise, Progress, and Decline, in Relation to Theologians, Scholars, Poets, Philosophers, and the People (1865).
- Grundlinien der Homiletik u. Liturgik (Basic Principles of Homiletics and Liturgics, 1863)
- Johann Oekolampad und Oswald Myconius, die Reformatoren Basels. Leben und ausgewählte Schriften (The Basel Reformers Johannes Oecolampadius and Oswald Myconius: Lives and Selected Works, 1859).
- Geschichte der theologische Schule Basels (History of the Basel School of Theology, 1860).
- Predigten (Sermons, Basel, 1858–1875).
- Luther und seine Zeit, a book of poems (Luther and his times, 1838)
- Gedichte (Poems, Basel, 1846).

The lectures on church history under the general title Vorlesungen über die Kirchengeschichte von der ältesten Zeit bis zum 19ten Jahrhundert (Lectures on the History of the Church from the Earliest Times up to the 19th Century) were reissued in seven volumes (1868–1872; vol. 1; vol. 2;vol. 3; vol. 4; vol. 5; vol. 6; vol. 7).

He edited the Kirchenblatt für die reformierte Schweiz (Church Newspaper for Reformed Switzerland, from 1845 to 1868), and also a series of biographies of the reformers of the Reformed Church, with selections from their writings (Leben und Schriften der Väter und Begründer der reformierten Kirche (Lives and Writings of the Fathers and Founders of the Reformed Church), Elberfeld, 1857–1862, 10 volumes), to which he contributed the lives of Johannes Oecolampadius and Oswald Myconius (1859, see above).
