= Gustav Heinrich Wiedemann =

German physicist (1826–1899)

Gustav Wiedemann
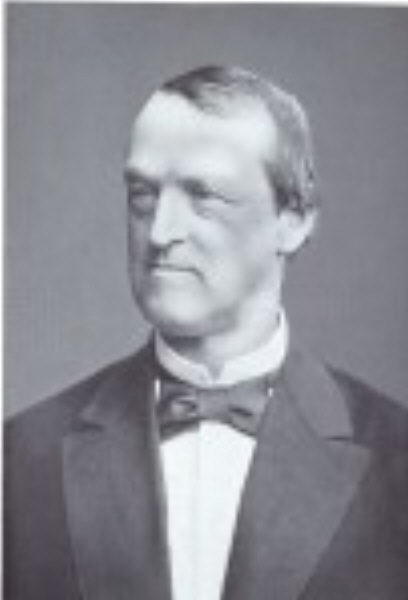
- Wiedemann c. 1860
- Born: Gustav Heinrich Wiedemann; 2 October 1826; Berlin, Prussia
- Died: 24 March 1899 (aged 72); Leipzig, German Empire
- Known for: Wiedemann effect Wiedemann–Franz law
- Children: Eilhard and Alfred
- Awards: ForMemRS (1884)
- Scientific career
- Fields: Physics
- Institutions: Karlsruhe Institute of Technology; Leipzig University; University of Basel; Technical University of Braunschweig
- Doctoral advisor: Heinrich Gustav Magnus
- Doctoral students: August Föppl; August Hagenbach; Johann Karl Friedrich Zöllner

Gustav Heinrich Wiedemann FRS(For) HFRSE (German pronunciation: [ˈɡʊsta(ː)f ˈhaɪnʁɪç ˈviːdəman]; 2 October 1826 – 24 March 1899) was a German physicist and scientific author.

== Life ==
Wiedemann was born in Berlin the son of a merchant who died two years later. Following the death of his mother in 1842, he lived with his grandparents.

After attending a private school as well as the Cölnische Humanistische Gymnasium, he entered the University of Berlin in 1844 where took his doctor's degree three years later under the supervision of Heinrich Gustav Magnus. His thesis on that occasion was devoted to a question in organic chemistry, for he held the opinion that the study of chemistry is an indispensable preliminary to the pursuit of physics, which was his ultimate aim. In Berlin he made the acquaintance of Hermann von Helmholtz at the house of Heinrich Gustav Magnus and was one of the founders of the Berlin Physical Society.

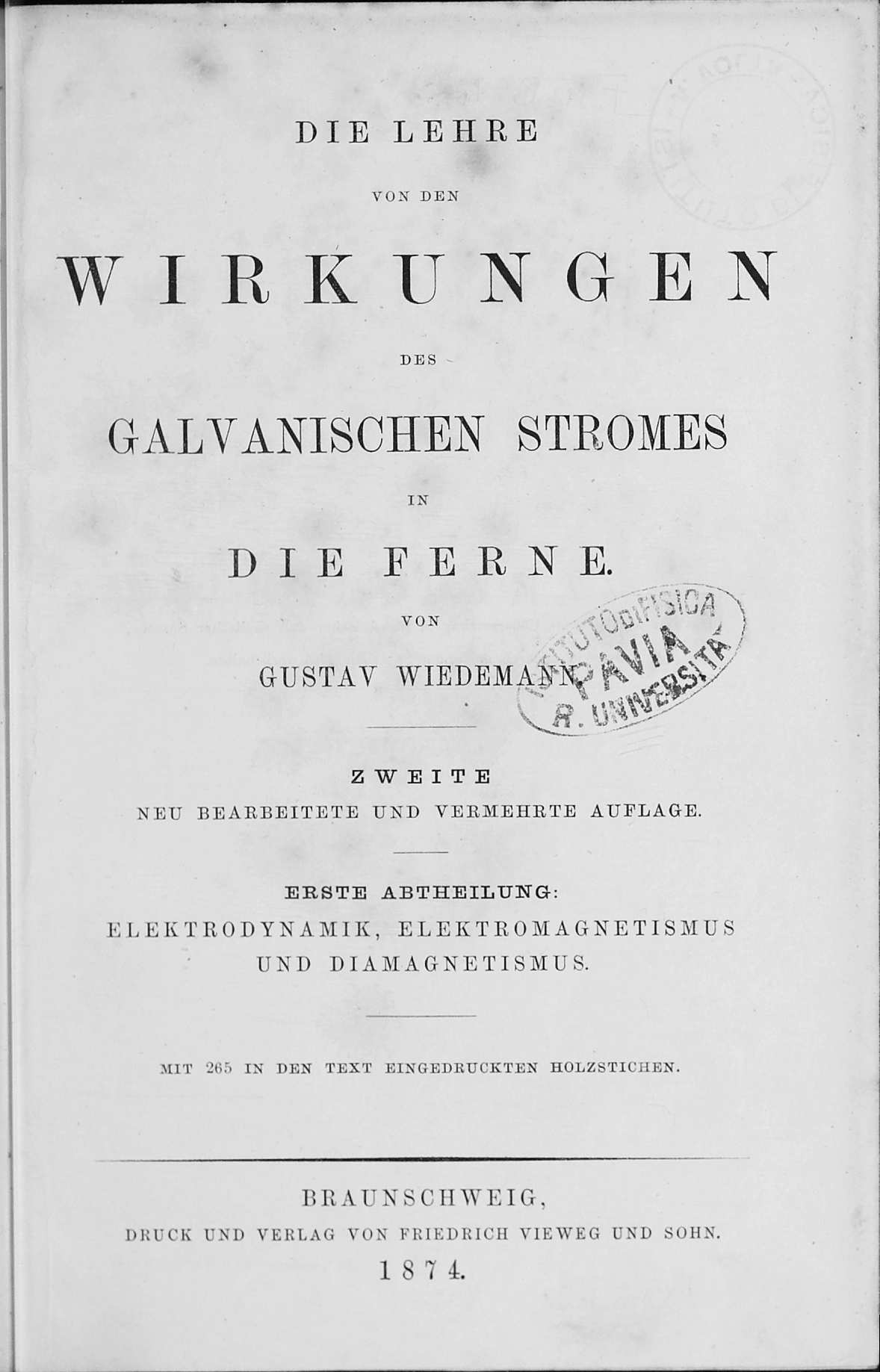
Lehre von den Wirkungen des galvanischen Stromes in die Ferne, 1874

In 1854 he left Germany to take on the role of Professor of Physics in Basel, nine years later he moved to Braunschweig and in 1866 to Karlsruhe. In 1871 he accepted the chair of physical chemistry at Leipzig. The attention he had paid to chemistry in the earlier part of his career enabled him to hold his own in this position, but he found his work more congenial when in 1887 he was transferred to the professorship of physics. With Rudolph Franz, Wiedemann developed the Wiedemann–Franz law relating thermal and electrical conductivity in 1853.

August Hagenbach was one of his students in Leipzig.

He was elected to Honorary membership of the Manchester Literary and Philosophical Society in 1892, before sadly dying in Leipzig on 24 March 1899.

== Literary work ==
His name is probably most widely known for his literary work. In 1877 he undertook the editorship of the Annalen der Physik und Chemie in succession to Johann Christian Poggendorff, thus starting the series of that scientific periodical which is familiarly cited as Wied. Ann. Another monumental work for which he was responsible was Die Lehre van der Elektricitat, or, as it was called in the first instance, Lehre von Galvanismus und Elektromagnetismus, a book that is unsurpassed for accuracy and comprehensiveness. He produced the first edition in 1861, and a fourth, revised and enlarged, was only completed a short time before his death.

== Scientific research ==
But his original work was also important. His data for the thermal conductivity of various metals were for long the most trustworthy at the disposal of physicists, and his determination of the ohm in terms of the specific resistance of mercury showed remarkable skill in quantitative research. He carried out a number of magnetic investigations which resulted in the discovery of many interesting phenomena, some of which have been rediscovered by others; they related among other things to the effect of mechanical strain on the magnetic properties of the magnetic metals, to the relation between the chemical composition of compound bodies and their magnetic properties, and to a curious parallelism between the laws of torsion and of magnetism (see Wiedemann effect). He also investigated electrical endosmosis and the electrical resistance of electrolytes.

== Family ==
In 1851 he married Clara Mitscherlich.

Their eldest son, Eilhard Ernst Gustav, born in Berlin on 1 August 1852, became professor of physics at Erlangen in 1886, and his younger son, Alfred, born in Berlin on 18 July 1856, was appointed to the extraordinary professorship of Egyptology at Bonn in 1892.

== Works ==
- Lehre von den Wirkungen des galvanischen Stromes in die Ferne (in German). Vol. 2. Braunschweig: Vieweg und Sohn. 1874.
  - Lehre von den Wirkungen des galvanischen Stromes in die Ferne (in German). Vol. 2. Braunschweig: Vieweg und Sohn. 1874.
- Lehre von der Elektricität (in German). Vol. 1. Braunschweig: Vieweg und Sohn. 1882.
  - Lehre von der Elektricität (in German). Vol. 2. Braunschweig: Vieweg und Sohn. 1883.
  - Lehre von der Elektricität (in German). Vol. 3. Braunschweig: Vieweg und Sohn. 1883.
  - Lehre von der Elektricität (in German). Vol. 4. Braunschweig: Vieweg und Sohn. 1885.
  - Lehre von der Elektricität (in German). Vol. 5. Braunschweig: Vieweg und Sohn. 1885.
