= Anti–nuclear power movement in Japan =

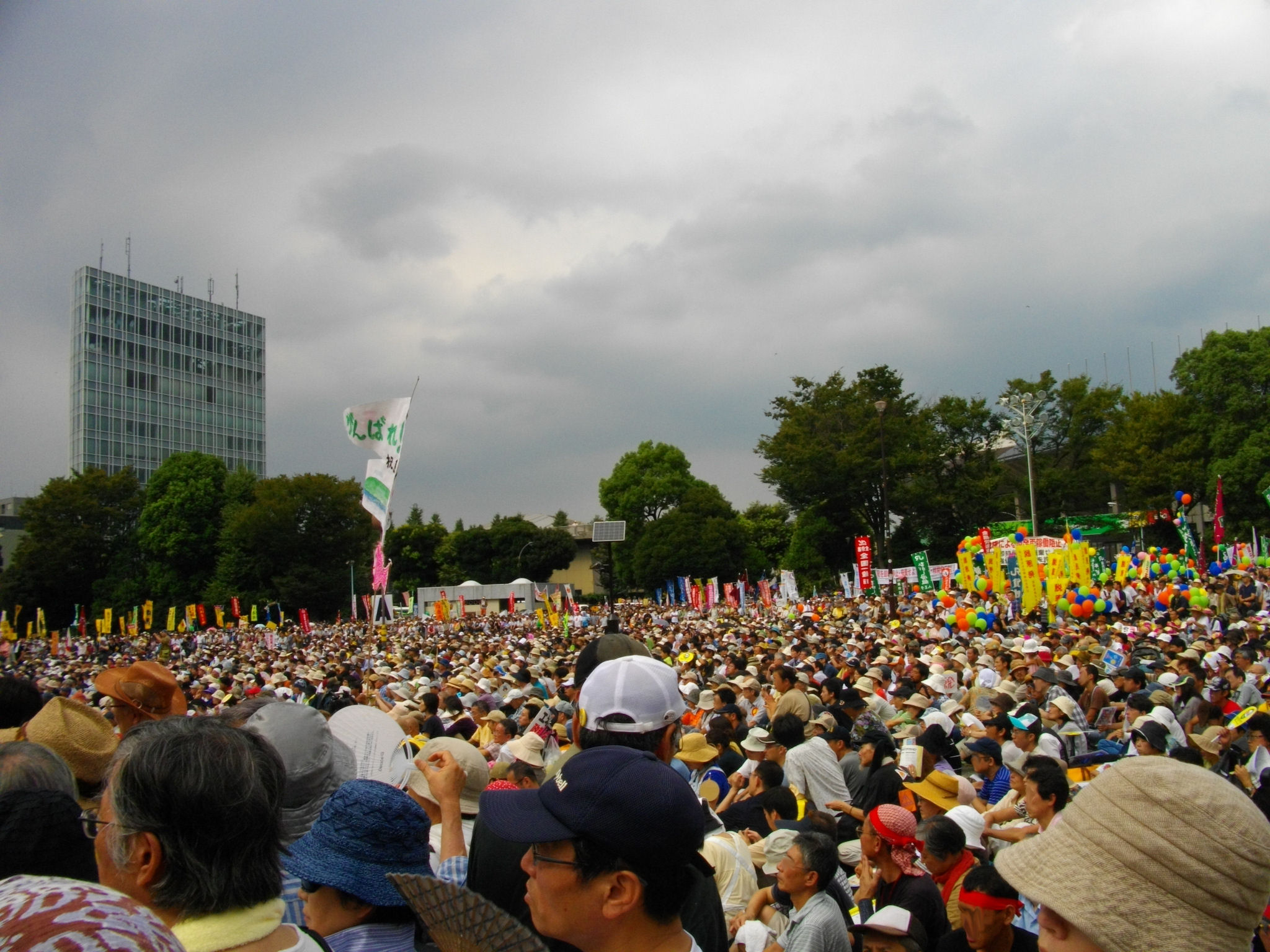
Anti-Nuclear Power Plant Rally on 19 September 2011 at Meiji Shrine complex in Tokyo.

Long one of the world's most committed promoters of civilian nuclear power, Japan's nuclear industry was not hit as hard by the effects of the 1979 Three Mile Island accident (USA) or the 1986 Chernobyl disaster (USSR) as some other countries. Construction of new plants continued to be strong through the 1980s and into the 1990s. However, starting in the mid-1990s there were several nuclear related accidents and cover-ups in Japan that eroded public perception of the industry, resulting in protests and resistance to new plants. These accidents included the Tokaimura nuclear accident, the Mihama steam explosion, cover-ups after accidents at the Monju reactor, and the 21 month shut down of the Kashiwazaki-Kariwa Nuclear Power Plant following an earthquake in 2007. Because of these events, Japan's nuclear industry has been scrutinized by the general public of the country.

The negative impact of the 2011 Fukushima Daiichi nuclear disaster has changed attitudes in Japan. Political and energy experts describe "nothing short of a nationwide loss of faith, not only in Japan's once-vaunted nuclear technology but also in the government, which many blame for allowing the accident to happen". Following the disaster, sixty thousand people demonstrated against nuclear power in central Tokyo on 19 September and 75,000 people demonstrated in July 2012.

Anti-nuclear groups include the Citizens' Nuclear Information Center, Stop Rokkasho, Hidankyo, Sayonara Nuclear Power Plants, Women from Fukushima Against Nukes, and the Article 9 group. People associated with the anti-nuclear movement include: Jinzaburo Takagi, Haruki Murakami, Kenzaburō Ōe, Nobuto Hosaka, Mizuho Fukushima, Ryuichi Sakamoto and Tetsunari Iida.

Former Prime Minister Shinzō Abe, who was elected in 2012, has put nuclear energy back on the political agenda, with plans to restart as many reactors as possible. In July 2015, the government submitted its ideas for reducing greenhouse gas emissions to the United Nations, and the proposal included a target for nuclear power to meet at least 20% of Japan's electricity consumption by 2030. Renewable energy sources, such as hydropower but also solar power, would contribute 22% or more. On 11 August 2015, the Sendai Nuclear Power Plant broke a four-year lull when it restarted one of its reactors. The restart is the first since Japan's nuclear power industry collapsed, following the 2011 Fukushima Daiichi disaster.

As of March 10, 2020, out of Japan's 56 nuclear reactors, 24 are due to be decommissioned, 9 are currently working and 7 are ready to be restarted. 3 new reactors are under construction, in order to meet Japan's Fifth Energy Basic Plan (20%–22% nuclear energy by 2030).

== History ==
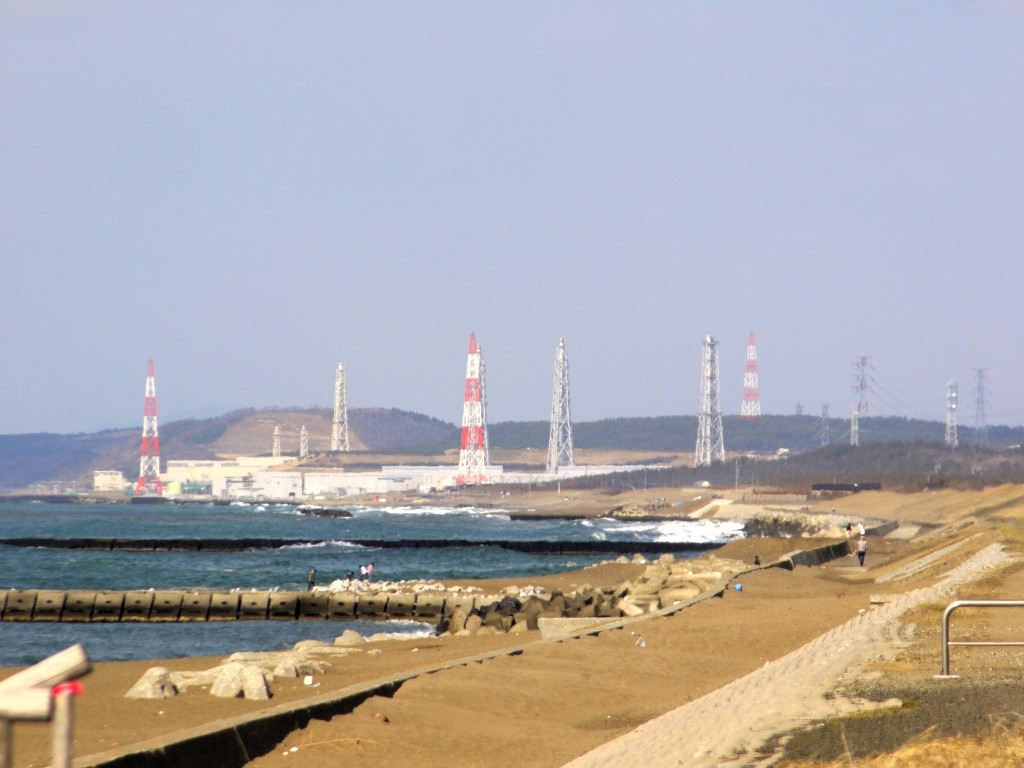
The Kashiwazaki-Kariwa Nuclear Power Plant, a nuclear plant with seven units, the largest single nuclear power station in the world, was completely shut down for 21 months following an earthquake in 2007.

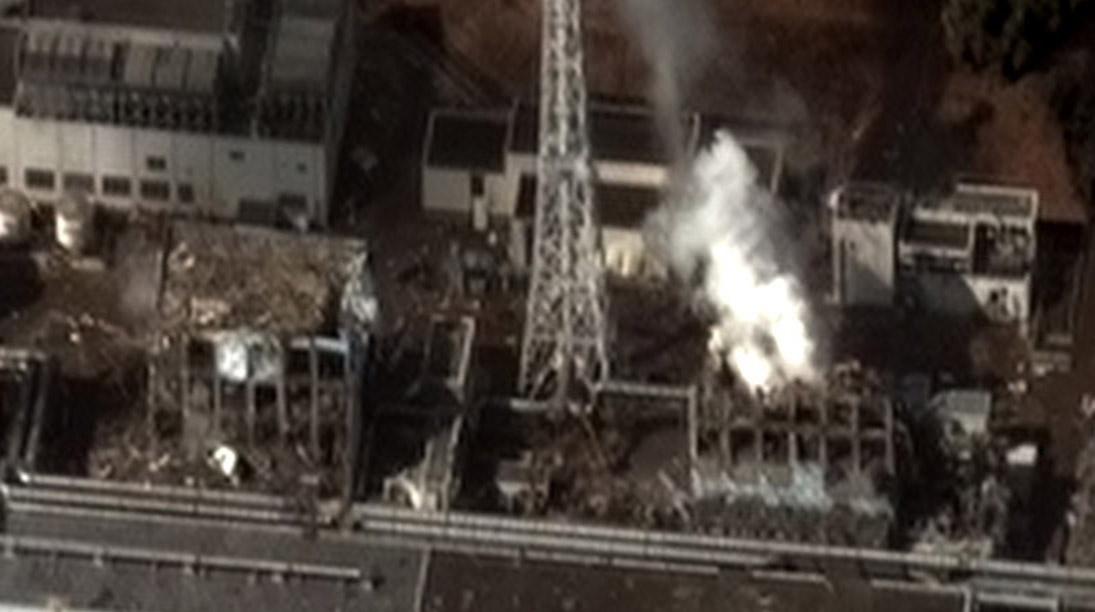
The 2011 Fukushima Daiichi nuclear disaster, the world's worst nuclear accident since 1986, displaced 50,000 households after radiation leaked into the air, soil and sea. Radiation checks led to bans of some shipments of vegetables and fish.

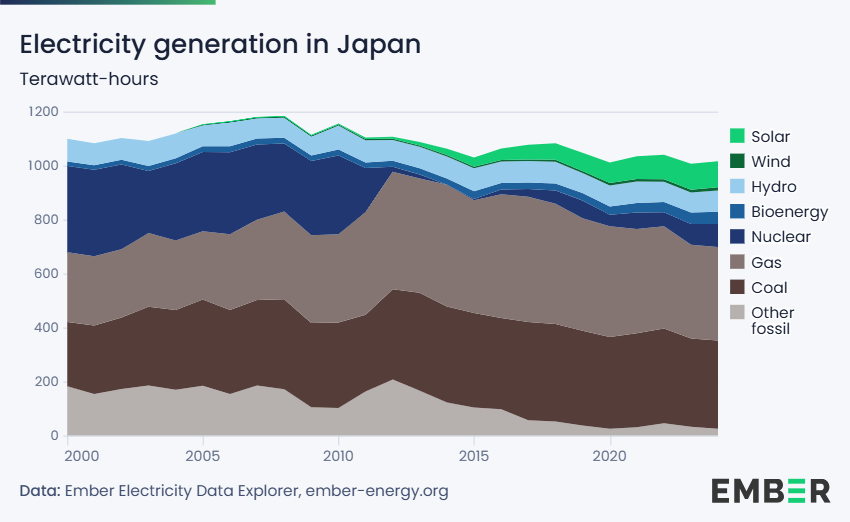
The use of nuclear power (in dark blue) in Japan declined significantly after the Fukushima accident

The first nuclear reactor in Japan was built by the United Kingdom's GEC. In the 1970s, the first light water reactors were built in cooperation with American companies. Robert Jay Lifton has said:

There was resistance, much of it from Hiroshima and Nagasaki survivors. But there was also a pattern of denial, cover-up and cozy bureaucratic collusion between industry and government, the last especially notorious in Japan but by no means limited to that country. Even then, pro-nuclear power forces could prevail only by managing to instill in the minds of Japanese people a dichotomy between the physics of nuclear power and that of nuclear weapons, an illusory distinction made not only in Japan but throughout the world.

Several nuclear accidents and cover-ups led to less public trust in nuclear programs; citizens became concerned about potential health impacts, the absence of a long-term nuclear waste storage facility, and nuclear weapons proliferation.

Research results show that some 95 post-war attempts to site and build nuclear power plants resulted in only 54 completions. Many affected communities "fought back in highly publicized battles". Co-ordinated opposition groups, such as the Citizens' Nuclear Information Center and the anti-nuclear newspaper Hangenpatsu Shinbun have operated since the early 1980s. Cancelled plant orders included:

- The Maki NPP at Maki, Niigata (Kambara)—Canceled in 2003
- The Kushima NPP at Kushima, Miyazaki—1997
- The Ashihama NPP at Ashihama, Mie Prefecture—2000 (the first Project at the site in the 1970s where realized at Hamaoka as Unit 1&2)
- The Hōhoku NPP at Hōhoku, Yamaguchi—1994
- The Suzu NPP at Suzu, Ishikawa—2003

Genpatsu-shinsai, meaning nuclear power plant earthquake disaster is a term which was coined by Japanese seismologist Professor Katsuhiko Ishibashi in 1997. It describes a domino effect scenario in which a major earthquake causes a severe accident at a nuclear power plant near a major population centre, resulting in an uncontrollable release of radiation in which the radiation levels make damage control and rescue impossible, and earthquake damage severely impedes the evacuation of the population. Ishibashi envisages that such an event would have a global impact and a 'fatal' effect on Japan, seriously affecting future generations.

== Groups ==
The Citizens' Nuclear Information Center is an anti-nuclear public interest organization dedicated to securing a nuclear-free world. It was established in Tokyo in 1975 to collect and analyze information related to nuclear power, including safety, economic, and proliferation issues. Data compiled by the CNIC is presented to the media, citizens' groups and policy makers. The CNIC is independent from government and industry. In 1995, Jinzaburo Takagi, the late former director of the Citizens' Nuclear Information Center, "warned about the dangers posed by the Fukushima No. 1 Nuclear Power Station and other old atomic plants", and also "cautioned the government and utilities about their policy of not assessing the safety risks for nuclear power stations beyond their assumed scenarios".

Green Action Japan is a non-governmental organisation (NGO) that was established in 1991 and works to create a nuclear-power-free Japan.

In 2008, members of hundreds of opposition groups demonstrated in central Tokyo to protest the building of the Rokkasho Plant, designed to allow commercial reprocessing of reactor waste to produce plutonium.

In July 2011, the Hidankyo, the group representing the 10,000 or so survivors of the atomic bombings in Japan, called for the first time for the elimination of civilian nuclear power. In its action plan for 2012, the group appealed for "halting construction of new nuclear plants and the gradual phasing out of Japan's 54 current reactors as energy alternatives are found".

The movement of "Women from Fukushima Against Nukes" (Genptasu iranai Fukushima kara no onnatachi) expresses views against nuclear power. Hundreds of women organized a sit-in protest at the Ministry of Economy headquarters from October 30 to November 5.

The founders of the Article 9 group advocate the removal of nuclear power from the nation's energy policy in light of Article 9 of the Japanese Constitution and the Fukushima nuclear disaster. Article 9 says that Japan forever renounces war, stating, "Land, sea and air forces as well as other war potential will never be maintained." Kenzaburō Ōe, one of the nine founders of the Article 9 Association, spoke at the group's national rally in Tokyo in November 2011, which drew about 700 people.

The Sayonara Nuclear Power Plants group will deliver the petition to local governments hosting nuclear plants or located near them to help pursue a society independent of nuclear energy. The group says it has many supporters, including Minamisoma Mayor Katsunobu Sakurai in Fukushima Prefecture and Tokai Village Mayor Tatsuya Murakami in Ibaraki Prefecture, in addition to film director Yoji Yamada, actress Sayuri Yoshinaga and other high-profile personalities. The group will hold a rally in Koriyama, Fukushima, on March 11, the first anniversary of the Fukushima nuclear disaster, and a rally in Tokyo on July 16, which the group hopes will draw 100,000 people.

The National Network of Parents to Protect Children from Radiation is a Japanese anti-nuclear organization with over 275 member organizations from Hokkaido to Okinawa. Mainly made up of mothers, the Tokyo area has the most groups, followed by the Osaka/Kyoto region and then the prefectures near the Fukushima Daiichi nuclear disaster.

Michael Banach, the Vatican representative to the International Atomic Energy Agency, said the events at Fukushima "raised new concerns about the safety of nuclear plants around the world". Bishops in Japan, Korea, and the Philippines, also spoke against nuclear power. Nobel Prize in Literature laureate Kenzaburō Ōe has said Japan should decide quickly to abandon its nuclear reactors.

== Campaigns ==
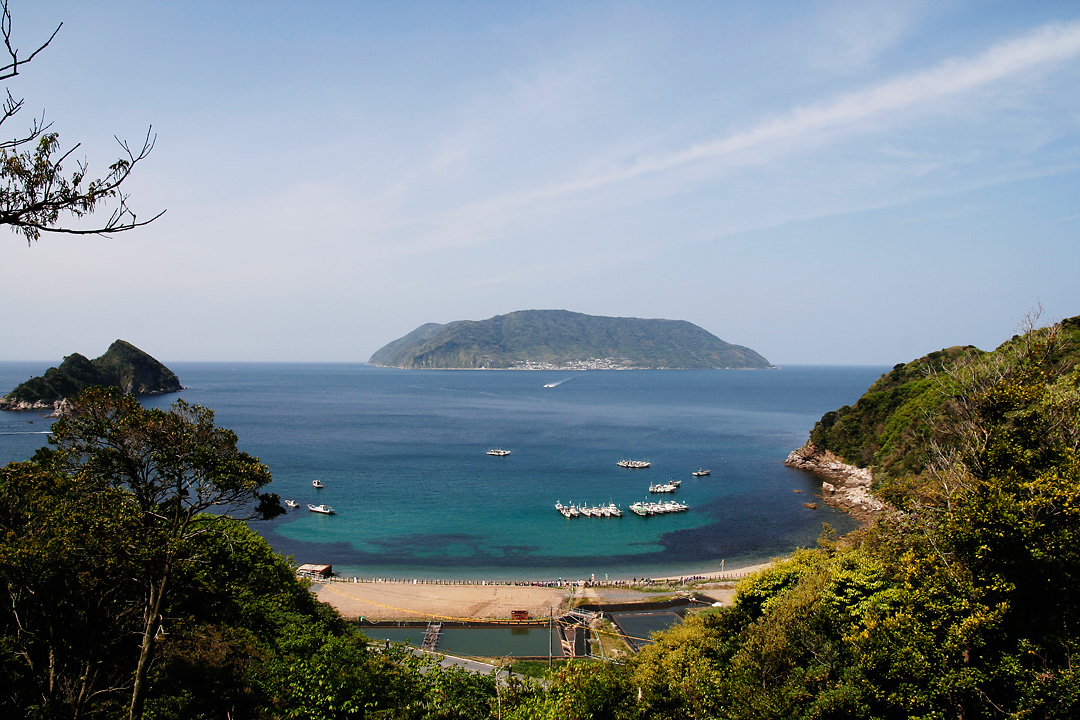
The intended site for the Kaminoseki NPP in Kaminoseki, Yamaguchi.

The proposed Kaminoseki Nuclear Power Plant is to be built on landfill in a national park in Japan's well-known and picturesque Seto Inland Sea. For three decades, local residents, fishermen, and environmental activists have opposed the plant. The Inland Sea has been the site of intense seismic activity, yet the utility involved continues with its plans. In January 2011, five Japanese young people held a hunger strike for more than a week, outside the Prefectural Government offices in Yamaguchi City, to protest site preparation for the planned Kaminoseki plant.

The possibility of a magnitude 8-plus earthquake in the Tokai region near the Hamaoka plant was "brought to the public's attention by geologist Ishibashi Katsuhiko in the 1970s". On 10 April 2011 protesters called for the Hamaoka nuclear-power plant to be shut down. On 6 May 2011, Prime Minister Naoto Kan ordered the Hamaoka Nuclear Power Plant be shut down as an earthquake of magnitude 8.0 or higher is likely to hit the area within the next 30 years. Kan wanted to avoid a possible repeat of the Fukushima disaster. On 9 May 2011, Chubu Electric decided to comply with the government request. Kan later called for a new energy policy with less reliance on nuclear power. In July 2011, a mayor in Shizuoka Prefecture and a group of residents filed a lawsuit seeking the permanent decommissioning of the reactors at the Hamaoka nuclear power plant.

In 1982, Chugoku Electric Power Company proposed building a nuclear power plant near Iwaishima, but many residents opposed the idea, and the island's fishing cooperative voted overwhelmingly against the plans. In January 1983, almost 400 islanders staged a protest march, which was the first of more than 1,000 protests the islanders conducted. Since the Fukushima nuclear disaster in March 2011 there has been wider opposition to construction plans for the plant.

== Protests ==
Public opposition to nuclear power existed in Japan before the Fukushima disaster. But it was not as strong and visible as it has been post-Fukushima, when demonstrators turned to the streets in the thousands to protest the use of nuclear power. Worldwide, the traumatic events in Japan in 2011 revitalised the anti-nuclear movement.

On January 27, 2008, several hundred Japanese organizations protested the Rokkasho Reprocessing Plant and collected 810,000 signatures on a petition, presented to the Cabinet Office and the Ministry of Economy, Trade and Industry.

=== 2011 ===
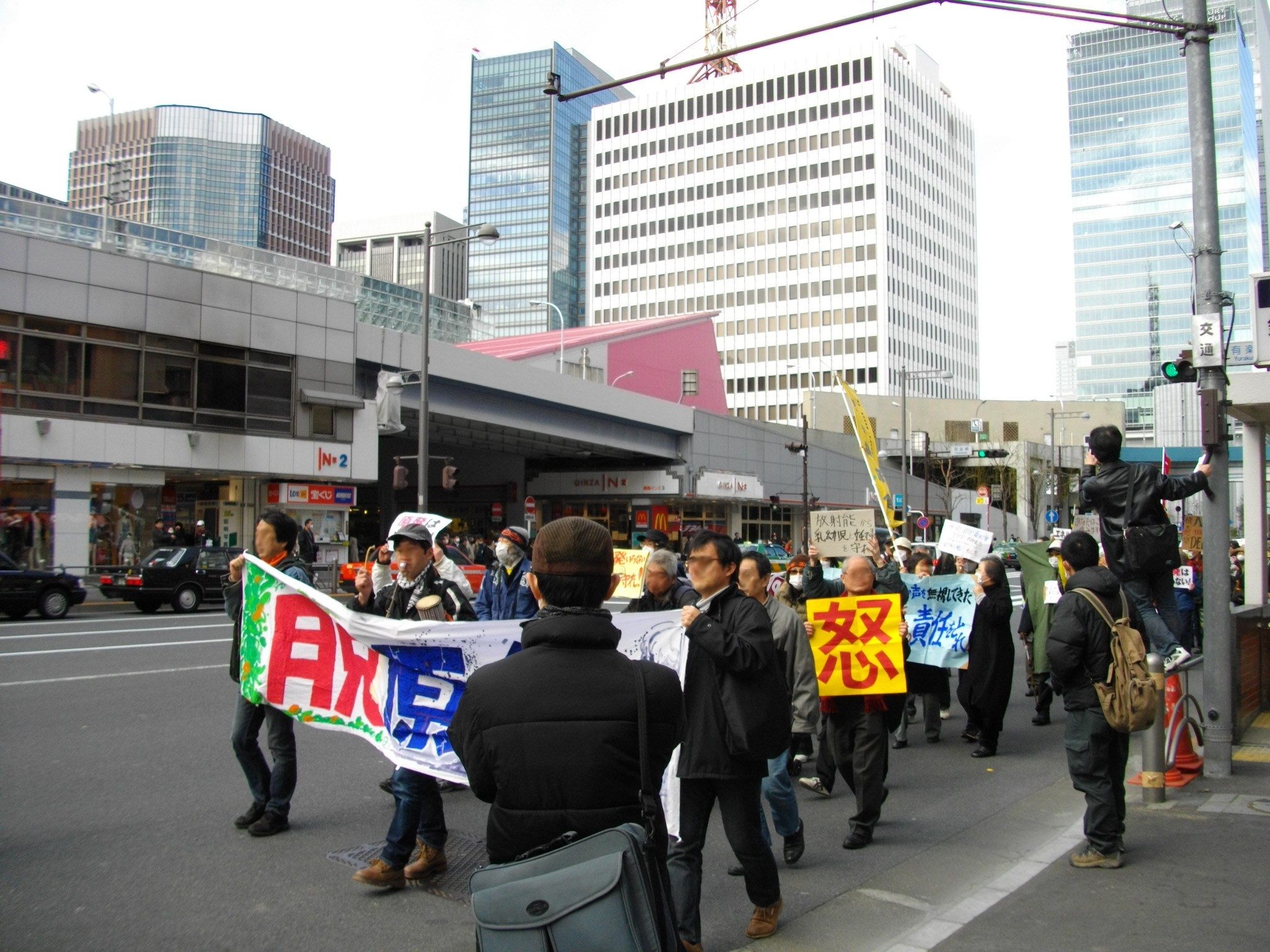
Anti nuclear rally in Tokyo on Sunday 27 March 2011.

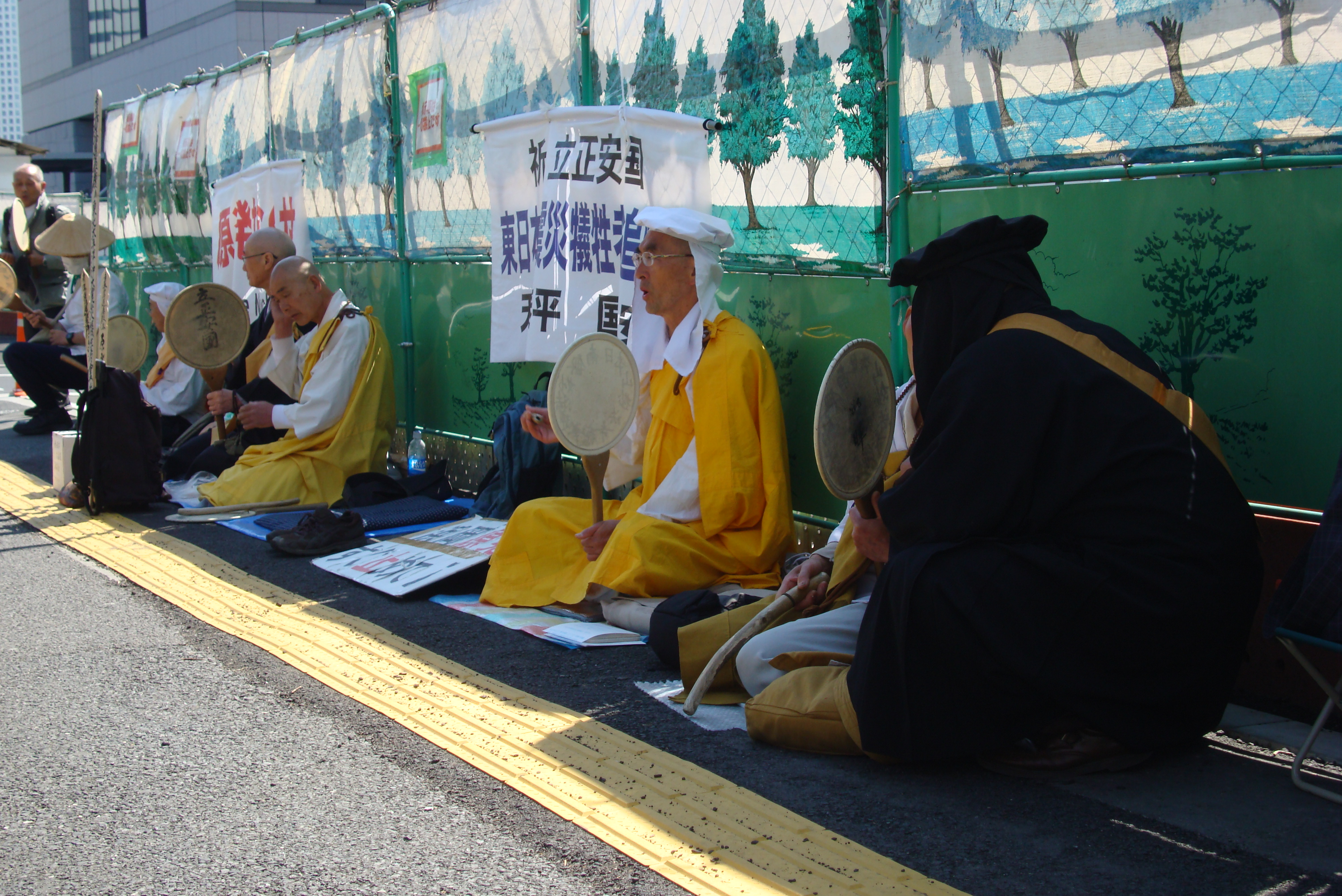
Buddhist monks of Nipponzan-Myōhōji protest against nuclear power near the Diet of Japan in Tokyo on April 5, 2011.

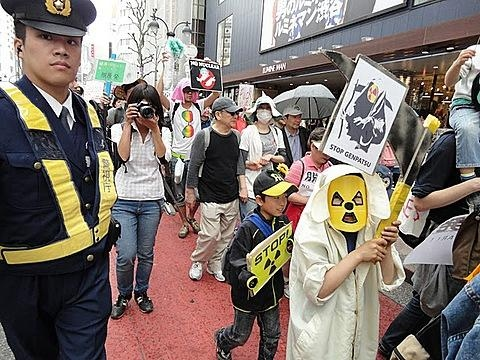
Peaceful anti-nuclear protest in Tokyo, Japan, escorted by policemen, 16 April 2011.

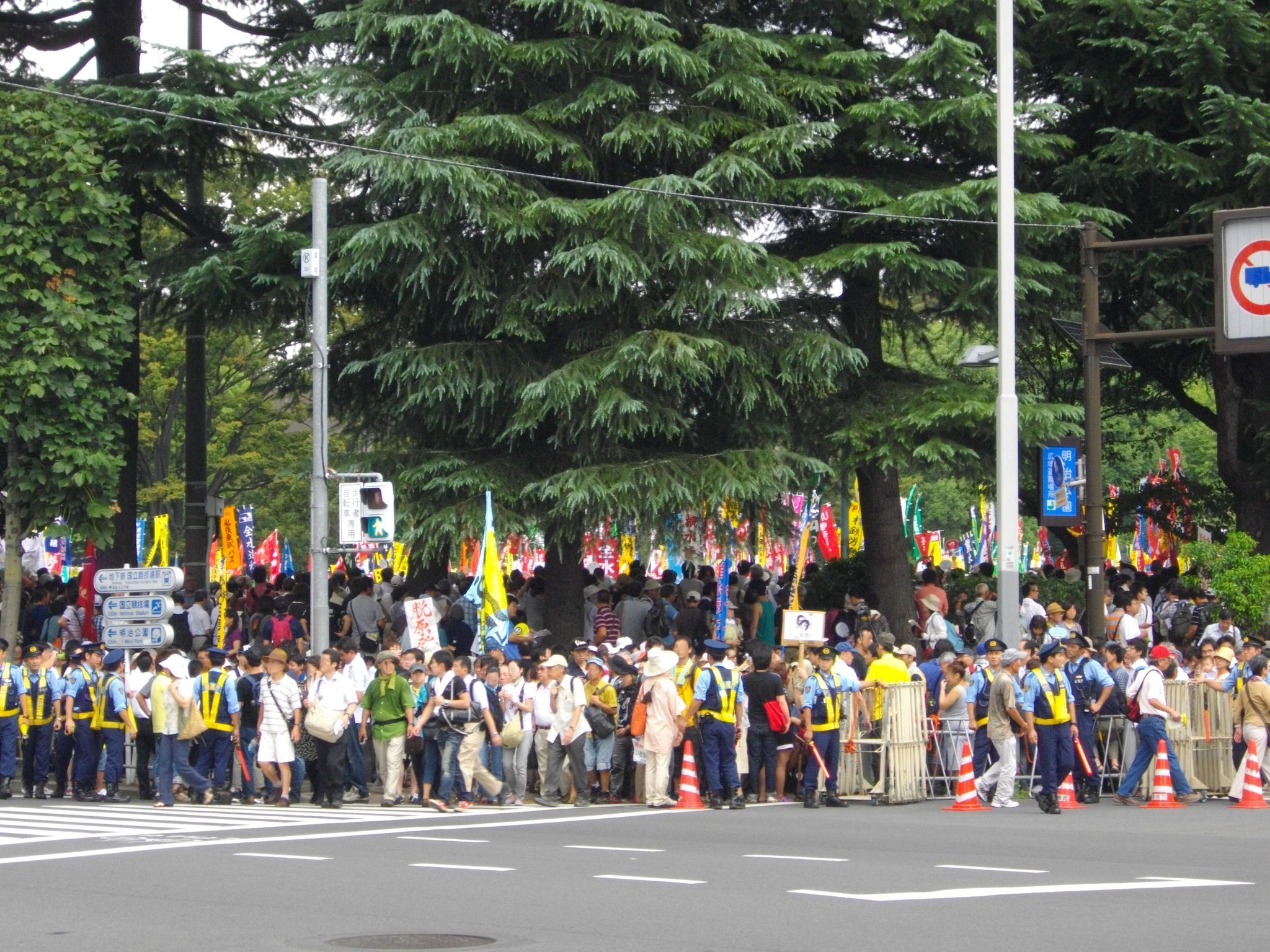
Anti-Nuclear Power Plant Rally on 19 September 2011 at Meiji Shrine Outer Garden

Several large protests occurred on April 10, 2011, a month following 3.11: 15,000 people marched in a "sound demonstration" organized by Shirōto no Ran (Revolt of the Laymen), a used-goods shop in Kōenji, Tokyo, while thousands also marched in Shiba Park, Tokyo and other locations. One protester, Yohei Nakamura, said nuclear power is a serious problem and that anti-nuclear demonstrations were undercovered in the Japanese press because of the influence of TEPCO."

Three months after the Fukushima nuclear disaster, thousands of anti-nuclear protesters marched in Japan. Company workers, students, and parents with children rallied across Japan, "venting their anger at the government's handling of the crisis, carrying flags bearing the words 'No Nukes!' and 'No More Fukushima'."

In August 2011, about 2,500 people including farmers and fishermen marched in Tokyo. They have incurred heavy losses following the Fukushima nuclear disaster, and called for prompt compensation from plant operator TEPCO and the government.

In September 2011, anti-nuclear protesters, marching to the beat of drums, "took to the streets of Tokyo and other cities to mark six months since the March earthquake and tsunami and vent their anger at the government's handling of the nuclear crisis set off by meltdowns at the Fukushima power plant". Protesters called for a complete shutdown of Japanese nuclear power plants and demanded a shift in government policy toward renewable energy sources. Among the protestors were four young men who started a 10-day hunger strike in an effort to bring about change in Japan's nuclear policy. Sixty thousand people demonstrated in central Tokyo on19 September 2011. Author Kenzaburō Ōe and musician Ryuichi Sakamoto were among the event's supporters.

=== 2012 ===
Thousands of demonstrators marched in Yokohama on the weekend of January 14–15, 2012, to show their support for a nuclear power-free world. The demonstration showed that organized opposition to nuclear power has gained momentum in the wake of the Fukushima nuclear disaster. The most immediate demand was for the protection of basic human rights for those affected by the Fukushima accident.

On the 2012 anniversary of the 11 March earthquake and tsunami all over Japan protesters called for the abolishing of nuclear power, and the scrapping of nuclear reactors.

- Tokyo: a 15,000-strong demonstration was held in the Ginza and the Kasumigaseki districts of Tokyo, marching by TEPCO headquarters and ending with a human chain around the Diet Building.
- Koriyama, Fukushima: 16,000 people were at a meeting, they walked through the city calling for the end of nuclear power.
- Shizuoka Prefecture: 1,100 people called for the scrapping of the Hamaoka reactors of Chubu Electric Power Co.
- Tsuruga, Fukui: 1,200 people marched in the streets of the city of Tsuruga, the home of the Monju fast-breeder reactor prototype and the nuclear reactors of Kansai Electric Power Co. The crowd objected the restart of the reactors of the Oi-nuclear power plant. Of which NISA did approve the so-called stress-tests, after the reactors were taken out of service for a regular check-up.
- Saga city, Aomori city: Likewise protests were held in the cities of Saga and Aomori and at various other places hosting nuclear facilities.
- Nagasaki and Hiroshima: Anti-nuclear protesters and atomic-bomb survivors marched together and demanded that Japan should end its dependency on nuclear power.

By March 2012, one year after the Fukushima disaster, all but two of Japan's nuclear reactors had been shut down; some were damaged by the quake and tsunami. Authority to restart the others after scheduled maintenance throughout the year was given to local governments, and in all cases local opposition prevented restarting. According to The Japan Times, the Fukushima nuclear disaster changed the national debate over energy policy almost overnight. "By shattering the government's long-pitched safety myth about nuclear power, the crisis dramatically raised public awareness about energy use and sparked strong anti-nuclear sentiment". In June 2012, a Pew Research Center poll showed 70% of Japanese surveyed wanted nuclear power use reduced or eliminated and 80% distrusted the government's ability to manage nuclear power.

Meanwhile, protests every Friday had begun in front of the prime minister's residence (kanteimae) in late March 2012; between late June and early August, about 150,000-200,000 gathered every week. 170,000 gathered in Yoyogi park for a Sayonara-Genpatsu demonstration in mid-July 2012, while about 200,000 marched around the government district and surrounded the Diet on July 29, 2012. Groups and activists websites, such as the Frying Dutchman's gathered notable audience. In July 2012, Ryuichi Sakamoto organized a concert entitled "No Nukes 2012," featuring performances by 18 groups including Yellow Magic Orchestra, Kraftwerk, Asian Kung-Fu Generation, Saito Kazuyoshi, Akihiro Namba, and others. The concert attracted 17,000 people over two days; its U-Stream simulcast was accessed 542,000 times. These protests against nuclear power were never as large as the anti-nuclear weapons protests in 1982 in Hiroshima (200,000) and Tokyo (400,000).

=== 2013 ===
On March 10, 2013, 40,000 protesters marched in Tokyo calling on the government to reject nuclear power.

More than 60,000 people marched on June 2 near the Diet building in Tokyo against the government's plan to restart nuclear power plants. Nobel laureate Kenzaburō Ōe attended the march. Marchers had gathered more than 8 million signatures in a petition against Japan's plan to restart nuclear power plants after the 2011 Fukushima nuclear disaster.

== People ==
Mizuho Fukushima is the leader of the Social Democratic Party of Japan, which has an anti-nuclear platform, and she has been referred to as a prominent anti-nuclear activist. For three decades, she was at the forefront of an often futile fight against the utilities that operated Japan's nuclear reactors, the corporations that built them and the bureaucrats who enabled them. That situation changed with the Fukushima Daiichi nuclear disaster in March 2011.

Kobayashi Yoshinori is an influential conservative who has criticized his pro-nuclear colleagues and supported the anti-nuclear movement. In August 2012 Kobayashi wrote a detailed assessment of the nuclear option and its problems. He argues that the risks of nuclear power are great and that the Fukushima nuclear disaster could have "cascaded out of control and left Tokyo uninhabitable". He compares TEPCOs actions to the Aum Shinrikyo sarin gas release in Tokyo's subways in 1995. The Sankei and Yomiuri newspapers are criticised for supporting nuclear power and he says nuclear power is just not necessary.

Jinzaburo Takagi was a Japanese assistant professor in nuclear chemistry. He wrote several books on environment protection, and on the threat posed by nuclear waste. He received the Yoko Tada Human Rights Award in 1992, and the Ihatobe Award in 1994. He was awarded the Right Livelihood Award in 1997, jointly with Mycle Schneider.

Koide Hiroaki began his career as a nuclear engineer forty years ago, when he believed that nuclear power was an important resource for the future. Quickly, however, he "recognized the flaws in Japan's nuclear power program and emerged as among the best informed of Japan's nuclear power critics". His most recent book, Genpatsu no uso (The Lie of Nuclear Power) became a bestseller in Japan.

Award-winning novelist Haruki Murakami has said that the Fukushima accident was the second major nuclear disaster that the Japanese people have experienced, but this time it was not a bomb being dropped. According to Murakami, the Japanese people should have rejected nuclear power after having "learned through the sacrifice of the hibakusha just how badly radiation leaves scars on the world and human wellbeing".

Nobel laureate Kenzaburō Ōe has been involved with pacifist and anti-nuclear campaigns and written books about the atomic bombings of Hiroshima and Nagasaki. In September 2011, he urged Prime Minister Yoshihiko Noda to "halt plans to restart nuclear power plants and instead abandon nuclear energy".

On March 12, 2011, after the Fukushima disaster, Naoto Kan flew in a helicopter to observe the Fukushima I Nuclear Power Plant and was heavily involved in efforts to effectively respond to the disaster.

Nobuto Hosaka is the mayor of Setagaya, Tokyo. He campaigned and won the mayor's job on an anti-nuclear platform in April 2011, just over a month after the Fukushima nuclear disaster. According to The Wall Street Journal, Hosaka "is determined to turn this city ward of 840,000 people, the largest in Tokyo, into the front-runner of a movement that will put an end to Japan's reliance on atomic power and accelerate the use of renewable energy".

Tetsunari Iida is director of the Institute for Sustainable Energy Policies in Japan. Following the Fukushima nuclear disaster, he is calling for a decrease in Japan's reliance on nuclear power and an increase in renewable energy use.

Setsuko Thurlow, a survivor of the Hiroshima atomic bombing, has spoken about the Fukushima nuclear disaster and questioned the world's reliance on nuclear energy at a United Nations meeting in New York in 2011. Thurlow, who has become a strong advocate of nuclear non-proliferation, spoke at the meeting alongside Kazu Sueishi, another Hiroshima A-bomb hibakusha.

Madarame Haruki, as Chairman of the Japanese Nuclear Safety Commission (2010-2012), was an ardent pro-nuclear advocate.

== Energy transition ==
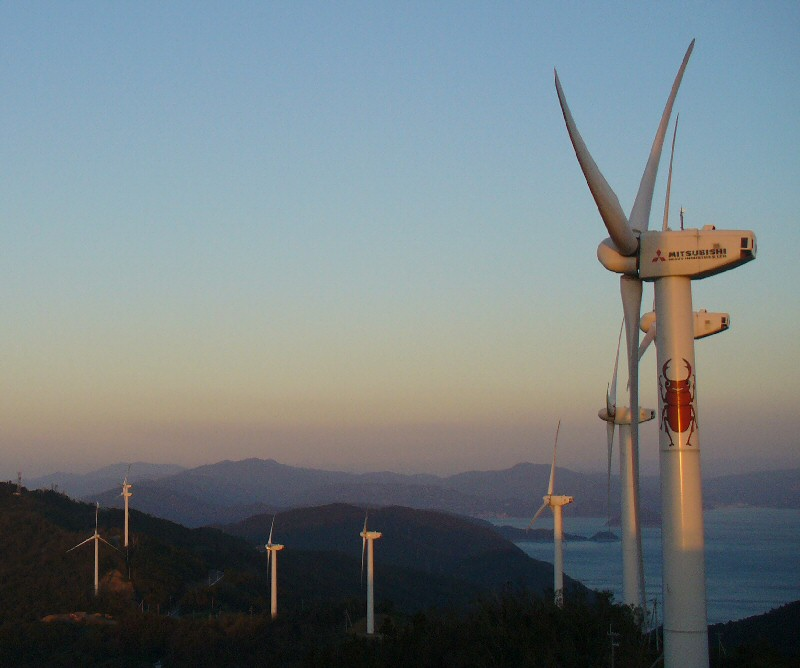
Part of the Seto Hill Windfarm in Japan, one of several windfarms that continued generating without interruption after the severe 2011 earthquake and tsunami followed by the Fukushima nuclear disaster.

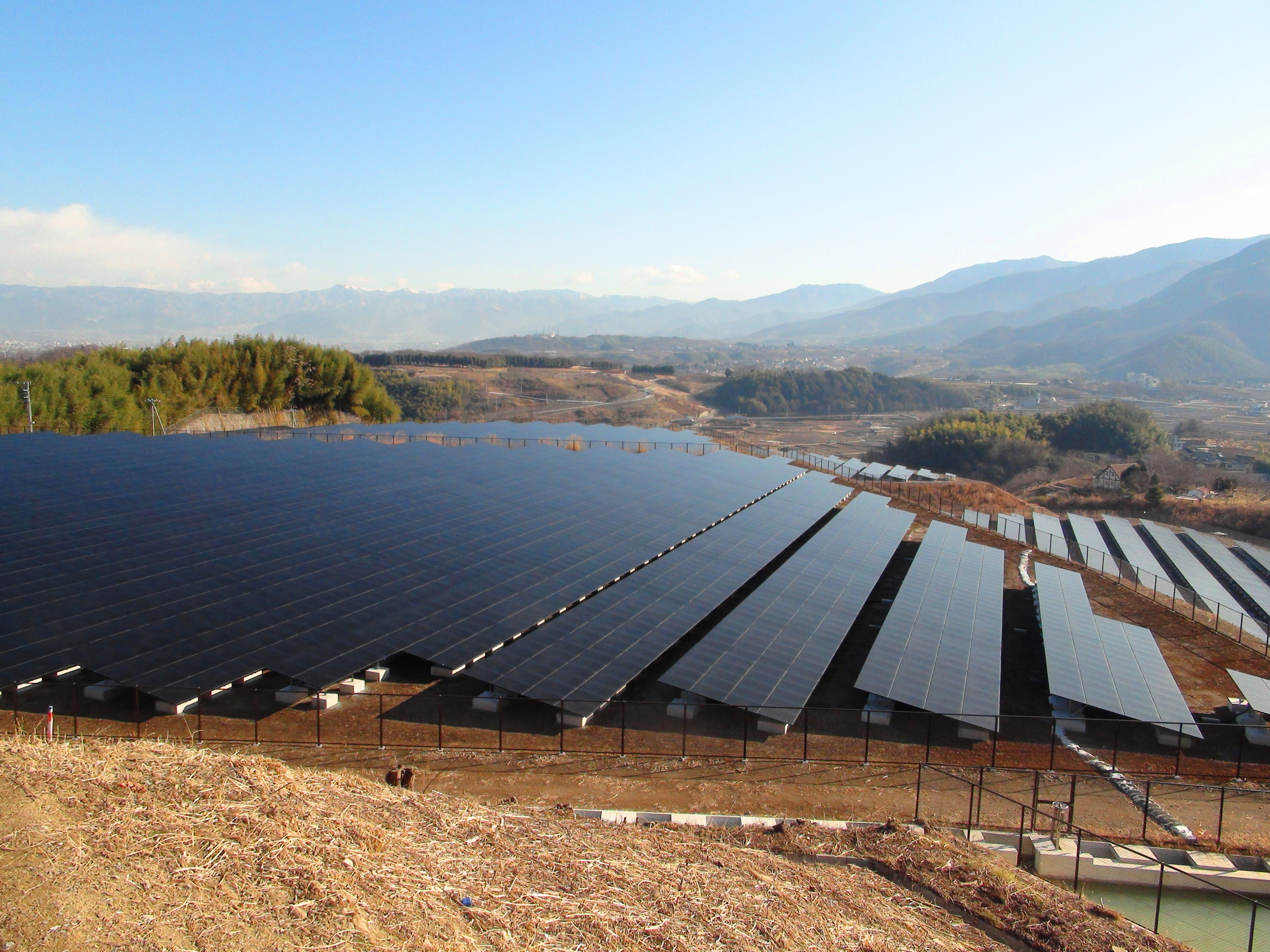
Komekurayama Solar Power Plant owned and operated by TEPCO in Kofu, Yamanashi Prefecture

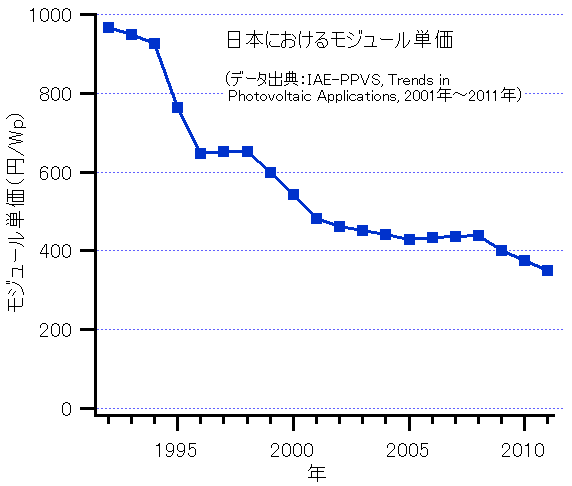
Price of PV modules (yen/Wp) in Japan

Solar power in Japan has been expanding since the late 1990s. The country is a leading manufacturer of solar panels and is in the top 5 ranking for countries with the most solar photovoltaics (PV) installed. In 2009 Japan had the third largest solar capacity in the world (behind Germany and Spain), with most of it grid connected. The solar insolation is good at about 4.3 to 4.8 kWh/(m^{2}·day). Japan is the world's fourth largest energy consumer, making solar power an important national project. By the end of 2012, Japan had installed 7,000 MW of photovoltaics, enough to generate 0.77% of Japan's electricity. Due to the new feed-in tariff (FIT), Japan installed more than 5,000 MW in 2013.

The former Prime Minister Shinzo Abe, who came to power in 2012, has put nuclear energy back on the political agenda, with plans to restart as many reactors as possible. In July 2015, the government submitted its ideas for reducing greenhouse-gas emissions to the United Nations, and the proposal included a target for nuclear power to meet at least 20% of Japan's electricity consumption by 2030. Renewable energy sources, such as hydropower and solar power, would contribute more than 22%.

== See also ==
- Nuclear power in Japan
- Greens Japan
- Horonobe, Hokkaidō
- Iwaishima
- Japan's non-nuclear policy
- Japanese nuclear weapons program
- Japanese nuclear incidents
- Nuclear energy policy
- Stop Rokkasho
- Three Non-Nuclear Principles
- United States-Japan Joint Nuclear Energy Action Plan
