= Sayonara Nuclear Power Plants =

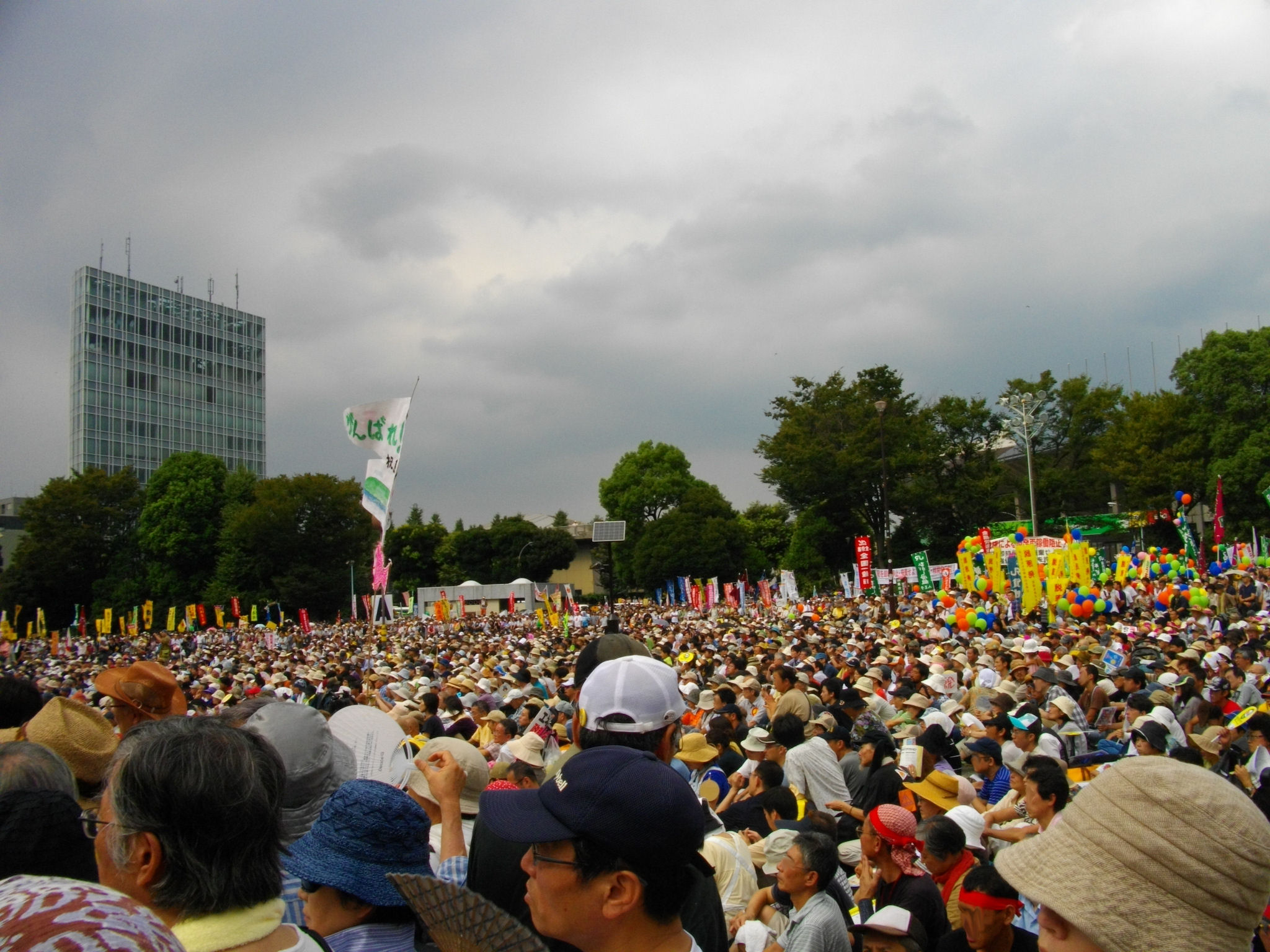
Anti-Nuclear Power Plant Rally on 19 September 2011 at Meiji Shrine complex in Tokyo. Sixty thousand people marched chanting "Sayonara nuclear power" and waving banners, to call on Japan's government to abandon nuclear power, following the Fukushima disaster.

Sayonara Nuclear Power Plants (Japanese: さようなら原発1000万人アクション, Hepburn: Sayōnara Genpatsu Issenmannin Akushon) is an anti-nuclear organization and campaign in Japan. Translated, its full name means "10-Million People Action [to say] Goodbye to Nuclear Power Plants", and as the name would suggest, its aim is to gather 10 million signatures protesting against nuclear power plants. As of December 2013, the campaign had collected 8.3 million signatures.

== Aims ==
The group would like to see Japan's energy policy shifted away from nuclear power and towards renewable energy. The group's petition says, "What has become clear from the Fukushima nuclear disaster and later developments is this hard fact: there is no nuclear energy that is safe. In other words, nuclear technology and humanity cannot coexist."

== Activities ==
As well as collecting signatures, the organization has held several anti-nuclear rallies. It held a rally of 60,000 people in Meiji Park (near Meiji Shrine), Tokyo, on September 17, 2011, and a rally in Koriyama, Fukushima, on March 11, 2012, the first anniversary of the Fukushima nuclear disaster. On July 16, 2012, it held a rally in Yoyogi Park, Tokyo, which drew 170,000 people. It has been suggested that these anti-nuclear protests and related activities may indicate new levels of political activism from urban workers and young people.

== Members ==
The group counts well-known celebrities in its ranks. Among the founding members are writer Kenzaburō Ōe, historian Shunsuke Tsurumi, and authors Hisae Sawachi, Katsuto Uchihashi and Keiko Ochiai. According to the group, its supporters also include Minamisoma Mayor Katsunobu Sakurai and Tokai Village Mayor Tatsuya Murakami, as well as film director Yoji Yamada and actress Sayuri Yoshinaga.

== See also ==
- Anti-nuclear groups
- Anti-nuclear power movement in Japan
- Genpatsu-shinsai
- Japanese reaction to Fukushima Daiichi nuclear disaster
- Politics of nuclear power
