= Jinzaburō =

- Gender: Male

Origin
- Origin: Japanese
- Meaning: Different meanings depending on the kanji used

Jinzaburō, Jinzaburo or Jinzaburou (written: 甚三郎 or 仁三郎) is a masculine Japanese given name. Notable people with the name include:

- Jinzaburō Masaki (真崎 甚三郎; 1876–1956), Japanese general
- Jinzaburo Takagi (高木 仁三郎; 1938–2000), Japanese nuclear chemist and writer
- Jinzaburo Yonezawa (born 1977), Japanese mixed martial artist
