= Japanese reaction to Fukushima nuclear accident =

Japanese reaction to the Fukushima nuclear disaster

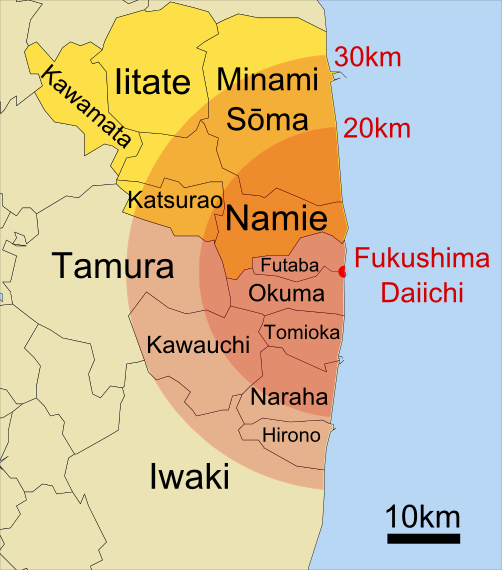
Japan towns, villages, and cities around the Daiichi nuclear plant. The 20km and 30km areas had evacuation and sheltering orders, respectively. Later, more evacuation orders were given beyond 20km in areas northwest of the site. This affected portions of the administrative districts highlighted in yellow.

Fukushima I and II Nuclear Accidents Overview Map showing evacuation and other zone progression and selected radiation levels

The Japanese reaction occurred after the Fukushima Daiichi nuclear disaster, following the 2011 Tōhoku earthquake and tsunami. A nuclear emergency was declared by the government of Japan on 11 March. Later Prime Minister Naoto Kan issued instructions that people within a 20 km (12 mi) zone around the Fukushima Daiichi nuclear plant must leave, and urged that those living between 20 km and 30 km from the site to stay indoors. The latter groups were also urged to evacuate on 25 March.

Japanese authorities admitted that lax standards and poor oversight contributed to the nuclear disaster. The government came under fire for their handling of the emergency, including the slow release of data on areas which were likely to be exposed to the radioactive plume from the reactor, as well as the severity of the disaster. The accident is the second biggest nuclear accident after the Chernobyl disaster, but is more complicated as three reactors suffered at least partial meltdowns.

Once a proponent of building more reactors, Prime Minister Naoto Kan took an increasingly anti-nuclear stance in the months following the Fukushima disaster. In May, he ordered the aging Hamaoka Nuclear Power Plant be closed over earthquake and tsunami fears, and said he would freeze plans to build new reactors. In July 2011, Mr. Kan said that "Japan should reduce and eventually eliminate its dependence on nuclear energy ... saying that the Fukushima accident had demonstrated the dangers of the technology". In August 2011, the Japanese Government passed a bill to subsidize electricity from renewable energy sources. An energy white paper, approved by the Japanese Cabinet in October 2011, says "public confidence in safety of nuclear power was greatly damaged" by the Fukushima disaster, and calls for a reduction in the nation's reliance on nuclear power.

== Initial government assessment and public understanding ==
Prime Minister Kan visited the plant for a briefing on 12 March. He had been quoted in the press calling for calm and minimizing exaggerated reports of danger. Kan met with Tokyo Electric Power Company (TEPCO) on 15 March and lamented the lack of information. According to press accounts, he asked, "What the hell is going on?" Secretary of Government Yukio Edano stated around 18 March, "We could have moved a little quicker in assessing the situation."

The nature and the scale of the meltdown were not communicated to the public in the early weeks. Japanese newspapers commented the first useful analysis of the accident was not given by the government or TEPCO, but by Masashi Gotō, a retired (1989-2009) Toshiba nuclear engineer whose predecessor designed the containment buildings of Fukushima Daiichi nuclear reactor in the 1960s, who had a series of press briefings at the Foreign Correspondents' Club of Japan starting from March 14, 2011.

== Requests for help ==
The Japanese government asked the United States to provide cooling equipment to the plant. As of 15 March, the U.S. had provided 3,265 kilograms (7,198 lb) of "special equipment", a fire truck, to help monitor and assess the situation at the plant.

The French nuclear accident response organization Groupe INTRA shipped some of its radiation-hardened mobile robot equipment to Japan to help with the nuclear accident. At least 130 tonnes of equipment has been shipped to Japan.

Japan requested that Russia send the Landysh, a floating water decontamination facility originally built with Japanese funding and intended for decommissioning nuclear submarines.

Former chiefs of key nuclear safety commissions and government agencies have apologized for overlooking important nuclear safety concerns.

The Japanese government has admitted it failed to keep records of key meetings during the Fukushima nuclear crisis. Such detailed notes are considered a key component of disaster management.

== Evacuations ==
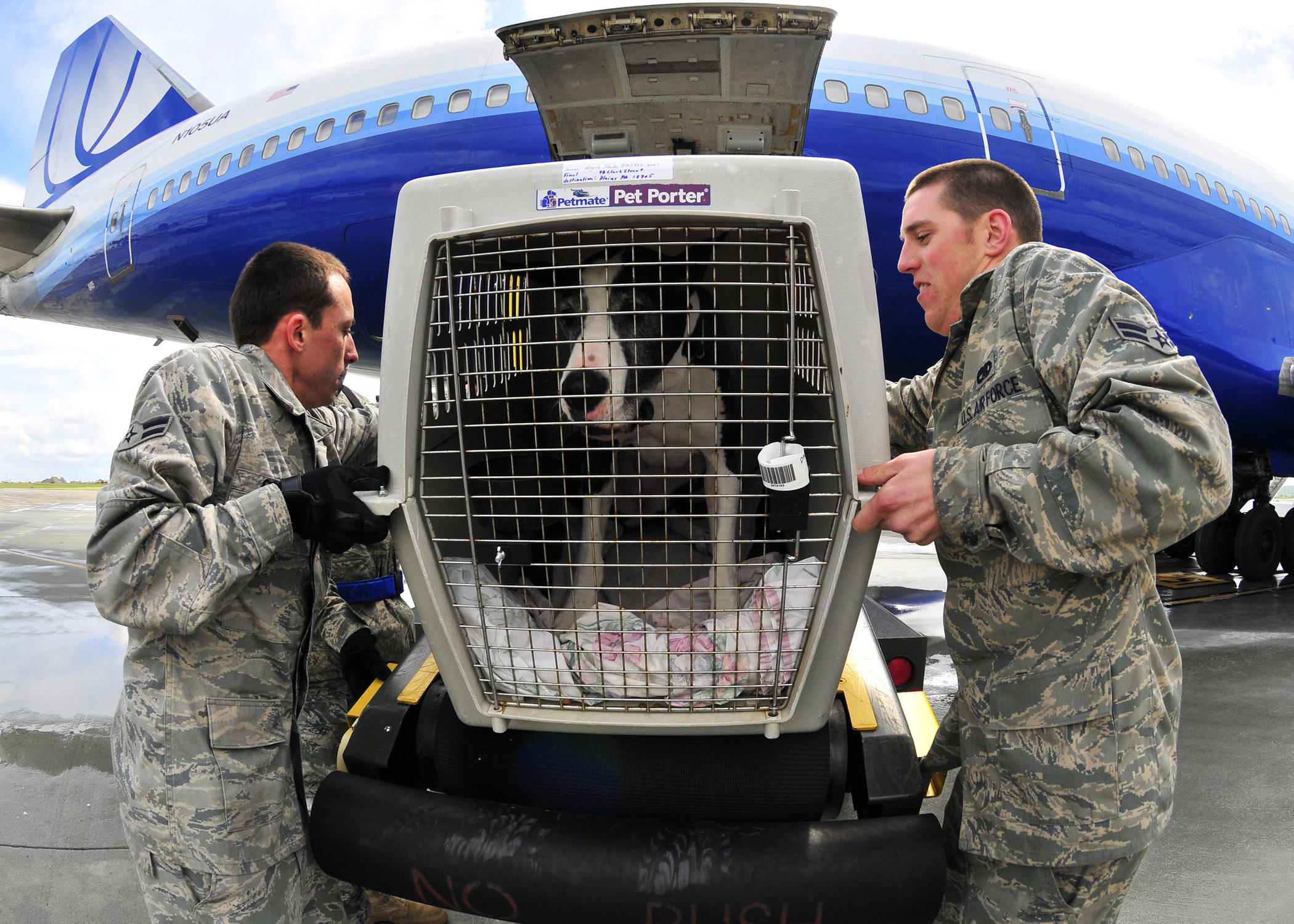
U.S. military dependent-family dog is unloaded off an evacuation flight from Japan.

After the declaration of a nuclear emergency by the Government at 19:03 on 11 March, the Fukushima prefecture ordered the evacuation of an estimated 1,864 people within a distance of 2 km from the plant. This was extended to 3 kilometres (1.9 mi) and 5,800 people at 21:23 by a directive to the local governor from the Prime Minister, together with instructions for residents within 10 kilometres (6.2 mi) of the plant to stay indoors. The evacuation was expanded to a 10 kilometres (6.2 mi) radius at 5:44 on 12 March, and then to 20 kilometres (12 mi) at 18:25, shortly before ordering use of seawater for emergency cooling.

The Guardian reported at 17:35 JST on 12 March that NHK advised residents of the Fukushima area "to stay inside, close doors and windows and turn off air conditioning. They were also advised to cover their mouths with masks, towels or handkerchiefs" as well as not to drink tap water. Air traffic has been restricted in a 20-kilometre (12 mi) radius around the plant, according to a NOTAM. The BBC has reported as of 22:49 JST (13:49 GMT) "A team from the National Institute of Radiological Sciences has been dispatched to Fukushima as a precaution, reports NHK. It was reportedly made up of doctors, nurses and other individuals with expertise in dealing with radiation exposure, and had been taken by helicopter to a base 5 km from the nuclear plant."

Over 50,000 people were evacuated during 12 March. The figure increased to 170,000–200,000 people on 13 March, after officials voiced the possibility of a meltdown.

On the morning of 15 March, the evacuation area was again extended. Prime Minister Naoto Kan issued instructions that any remaining people within a 20 km (12 mi) zone around the plant must leave, and urged that those living between 20 km and 30 km from the site should stay indoors. A 30 km no-fly zone has been introduced around the plant.

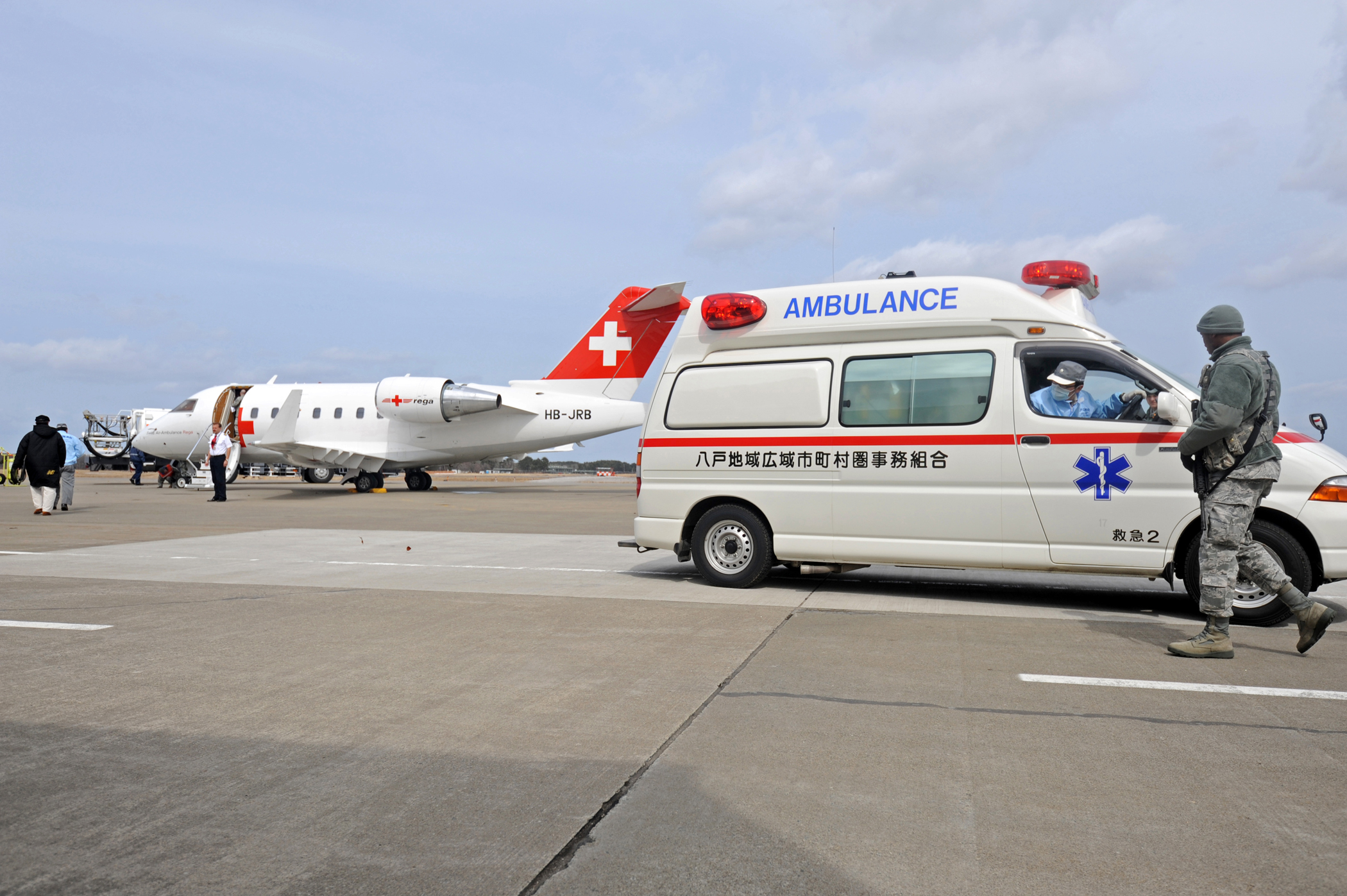
Evacuation flight departs Misawa.

On 16 March, the U.S. Embassy advised Americans in Japan to leave areas within "approximately 50 miles" (80 km) from the plant. Gregory Jaczko, the chairman of the United States Nuclear Regulatory Commission, said before the United States Congress, believing the Japanese government was not telling the full story, "We would recommend an evacuation to a much larger radius than has currently been provided by Japan." Spain advised to leave an area of 120 km, Germany advised to leave even the metropolitan area of Tokyo, and South Korea advised to leave farther than 80 km and plans to evacuate by all possible means. Travel to Japan was very low, but additional flights were chartered to evacuate foreigners. Official evacuation of Japan was started by several nations. The US military expected to voluntarily evacuate over 7000 family dependents from Japan, and moved ships under repair away from Japanese ports.

Of 90 bedridden patients moved from a hospital in the town of Futaba-machi, a sample of three patients were tested and shown to have been exposed to radiation. The patients had been waiting outdoors for rescuers before being moved by helicopter at the time an explosion happened. On 25 March, residents in the 30 kilometer circle were urged to leave their houses as well.

On 30 March the International Atomic Energy Agency (IAEA) discovered 20 MBq/m^{2} of Iodine-131 samples taken from 18 to 26 March in Iitate, Fukushima, 40 km northwest of the Fukushima I reactor. The IAEA recommended expanding the evacuation area, based on its criteria of 10 MBq/m^{2}. Japanese Secretary Yukio Edano stated the government would wait to see if the high radiation continued. On 31 March the IAEA announced a new value of 7 MBq/m^{2}, in samples taken from 19 to 29 March in Iitate. The material decays at 8% to 9% each day.

On 11 April, with ongoing concerns about the stability of the reactors, Japan considered extending the evacuation zone around the Fukushima I. Then, on 21 April 2011, the Japanese government declared a 20-km zone around Daiichi as a "no-go" zone, and threatened anyone who entered or remained in the zone with arrest or detention and fines. The order affected 80,000 residents. Shortly thereafter, on 22 April, the Japanese government officially announced that the evacuation zone would be extended from the 20 km "circular" zone to an irregular zone extending northwest of the Fukushima site. Then, on 16 May, the Japanese government began evacuating people from outside the official exclusion zones, including the village of Iitate, where high levels of radiation had been repeatedly measured.

Evacuees from the radiation zone have reported that some evacuation shelters, including ones run by the city of Tsukuba, Ibaraki, have refused to allow them entrance to their facilities, claiming that the evacuees could be carrying radioactive contamination with them. The shelters have required the evacuees to present certificates obtained by the government of Fukushima prefecture stating that the evacuees are "radiation free".

As of September 2011, more than 100,000 Fukushima Prefecture residents are still subject to a range of evacuation measures, forcing them to live outside their home cities and towns. Some locations near the crippled nuclear power plant are estimated to be contaminated with accumulated radiation doses of more than 500 millisieverts a year, diminishing residents' hopes of returning home anytime soon. Even areas away from the nuclear plant are still suffering from a sharp decline in tourism and sluggish financial conditions.

As of 23 February 2012, 62,674 Fukushima residents had evacuated from the prefecture.

In 2012, ex-prime minister Naoto Kan was interviewed about the Fukushima nuclear disaster, and has said that at one point Japan faced a situation where there was a chance that people might not be able to live in the capital zone including Tokyo and would have to evacuate. He says he is haunted by the specter of an even bigger nuclear crisis forcing tens of millions of people to flee Tokyo and threatening the nation's existence. "If things had reached that level, not only would the public have had to face hardships but Japan's very existence would have been in peril". That convinced Kan to "declare the need for Japan to end its reliance on atomic power and promote renewable sources of energy such as solar that have long taken a back seat in the resource-poor country's energy mix". Government Officials revealed in interviews that they were grappling the possibility of a "demonic chain reaction": If Fukushima collapsed and released enough radiation, it was "possible that other nearby nuclear power plants would have to be abandoned and could also collapse, thereby necessitating the evacuation of one of the world’s largest cities".

=== Evacuation drills ===
In Japan, during each fiscal year, a prefecture that has nuclear power stations in its territory is legally bound to hold nuclear accident disaster drills, demonstrating how to evacuate the population out of the 10-kilometer evacuation zone according to the governmental anti-disaster guidelines. The Fukishima Daiichi accidents proved this 10-kilometer zone to be an underestimation of the evacuation zones that would actually be needed to protect the population of the prefecture from escaping radiation in a proper way. On 5 September 2011, three prefectures—Aomori, Fukushima and Ibaraki—were unable to hold the drills before March 2012. Six prefectures, including Hokkaido and Fukui, had not taken a decision to hold a drill and were awaiting new governmental guidelines on how far to evacuate. Four other prefectures, including Ehime and Saga, planned to hold drills by establishing temporary guidelines and by expanding evacuation zones on their own. The Nuclear Safety Commission aimed to review the evacuation zones and other policies by the end of October.

=== Revising the nuclear disaster response: widening evacuation zones ===
On 20 October 2011, the Nuclear Safety Commission of Japan published its views on the evacuation zones around nuclear plants in case of accidents. Instead of the 10-kilometer evacuation-zone previously thought to be sufficient to protect inhabitants, a circle of 30 kilometer was proposed as Urgent Protective Action Planning Zones, or UPZ. This definition was in line with the emergency response requirements proposed by the International Atomic Energy Agency. This draft plan included the designation of areas within 5 kilometers of plants as precautionary action zones, where residents would immediately evacuate in the event of an accident. Residents within a radius of about 50 kilometers would be prepared to take immediately action to prevent internal exposure to their thyroid glands by taking iodine tablets. Further studies were planned with experts and municipalities. Implementation of this plan would mean a major review of all anti-nuclear disaster programs by local governments, and it would increase the number of municipalities involved up to around 130, about three times more than the present figure.

=== Long-term effects ===
Multiple studies about the Great East Japan Earthquake released during the early 2010s.

== Meltdowns and radiation ==
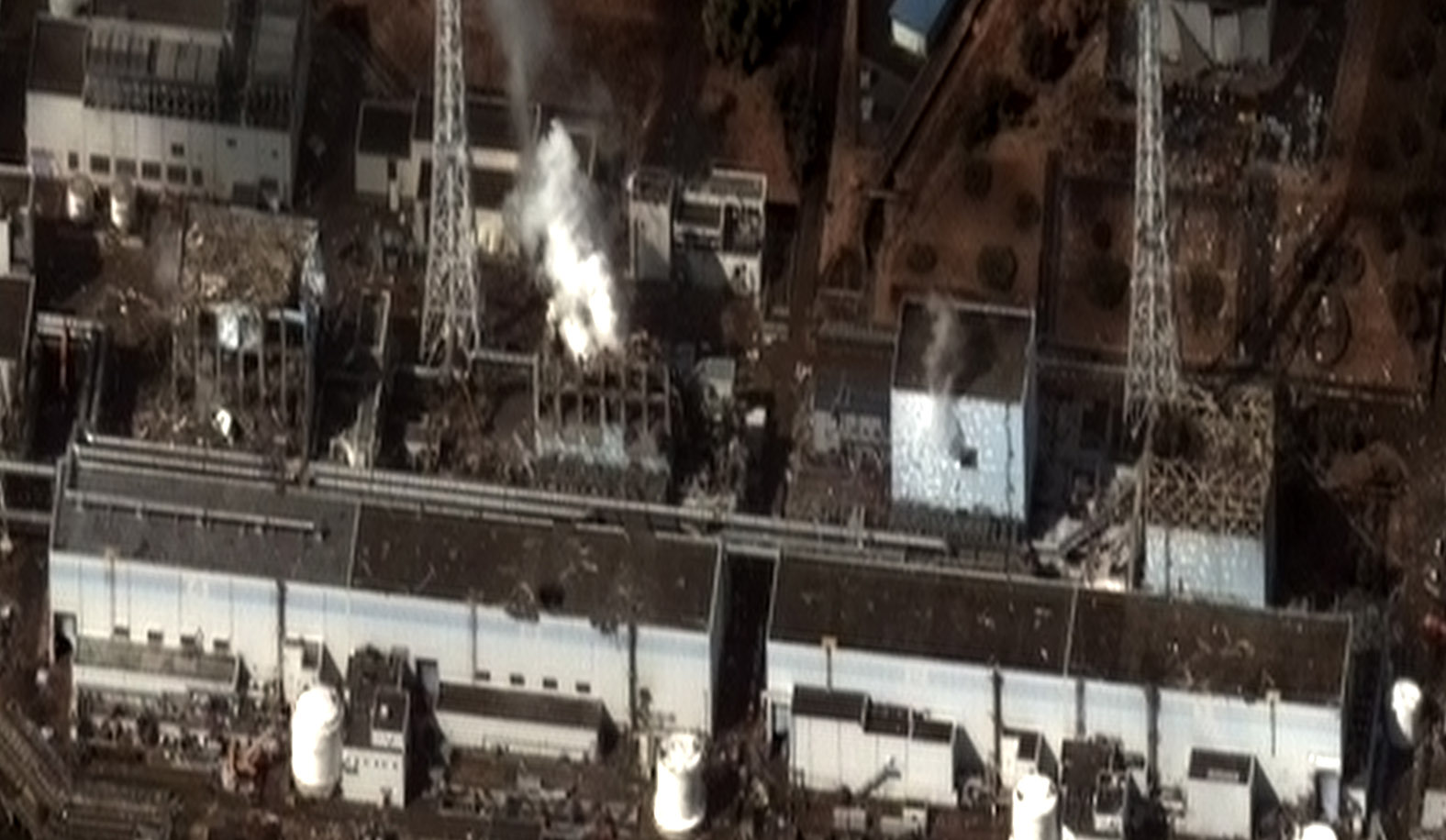
Three of the reactors at Fukushima Daiichi overheated, causing meltdowns that eventually led to hydrogen explosions, which released large amounts of radioactive gases into the air.

Nuclear meltdowns at three of Fukushima Daiichi's six reactors went officially unacknowledged for months:

In one of the most damning admissions, nuclear regulators said in early June that inspectors had found tellurium 132, which experts call telltale evidence of reactor meltdowns, a day after the tsunami — but did not tell the public for nearly three months. For months after the disaster, the government flip-flopped on the level of radiation permissible on school grounds, causing continuing confusion and anguish about the safety of schoolchildren here in Fukushima.

At 12:33 JST on 13 March the Chief Cabinet Secretary, Yukio Edano, was reported to have confirmed that there was a "significant chance" that radioactive fuel rods had partially melted in Unit 3 and Unit 1, or that "it was 'highly possible' a partial meltdown was underway". "I am trying to be careful with words... This is not a situation where the whole core suffers a meltdown". Soon after, Edano denied that a meltdown was in progress. He claimed that the radioactive fuel rods had not partially melted and he emphasized that there was no danger to the health of the population. Edano later said that there were signs that the fuel rods were melting in all three reactors. "Although we cannot directly check it, it's highly likely happening".

In April 2011 the United States Nuclear Regulatory Commission said that some of the core of a stricken Japanese reactor had probably leaked from its steel pressure vessel into the bottom of the containment structure, implying that the reactor damage was worse than previously thought. If molten fuel has "left the reactor’s pressure vessel and reached the drywell in substantial quantities, it raises the possibility that the fuel could escape the larger containment structure, leading to a large-scale radioactive release".

According to the Federation of Electric Power Companies of Japan, "by April 27 approximately 55 percent of the fuel in reactor unit 1 had melted, along with 35 percent of the fuel in unit 2, and 30 percent of the fuel in unit 3; and overheated spent fuels in the storage pools of units 3 and 4 probably were also damaged". The accident has surpassed the 1979 Three Mile Island accident in seriousness, and is comparable to the 1986 Chernobyl disaster. The Economist reports that the Fukushima disaster is "a bit like three Three Mile Islands in a row, with added damage in the spent-fuel stores", and that there will be ongoing impacts:

Years of clean-up will drag into decades. A permanent exclusion zone could end up stretching beyond the plant’s perimeter. Seriously exposed workers may be at increased risk of cancers for the rest of their lives...

On March 24, 2011, Japanese officials announced that "radioactive iodine-131 exceeding safety limits for infants had been detected at 18 water-purification plants in Tokyo and five other prefectures". Officials said also that the fallout from the Dai-ichi plant is "hindering search efforts for victims from the March 11 earthquake and tsunami".

A report from the Japanese Government to the IAEA says the "nuclear fuel in three reactors probably melted through the inner containment vessels, not just the core". The report says the "inadequate" basic reactor design — the Mark-1 model developed by General Electric — included "the venting system for the containment vessels and the location of spent fuel cooling pools high in the buildings, which resulted in leaks of radioactive water that hampered repair work".

As of July 2011, the Japanese government has been unable to control the spread of radioactive material into the nation's food, and "Japanese agricultural officials say meat from more than 500 cattle that were likely to have been contaminated with radioactive cesium has made its way to supermarkets and restaurants across Japan". Radioactive material has also been detected in a range of other produce, including spinach, tea leaves, milk, and fish, up to 200 miles from the nuclear plant. Inside the 12-mile evacuation zone around the plant, all farming has been abandoned.

As of August 2011, the crippled Fukushima nuclear plant is still leaking low levels of radioactive material and areas surrounding it could remain uninhabitable for decades due to high radiation. It could take "more than 20 years before residents could safely return to areas with current radiation readings of 200 millisieverts per year, and a decade for areas at 100 millisieverts per year".

Six months after the beginning of the Fukushima crisis, Mycle Schneider says the situation remains desperate:

...the technical situation at the Fukushima Daiichi plant is everything but stable. Families and farmers in the region remain desperate. Evacuated families had to leave their pets starving and don't know if they ever can go back to their homes. Farmers had to kill their cattle and destroy their harvests. Some finished by killing themselves. A French independent radioactivity-measuring lab announced recently that it identified up to 700,000 becquerel of cesium per square meter on grass in a primary school in Fukushima City, over 60 kilometers from the Daiichi plant.

=== Radiation in schools ===
In the non-evacuated areas, the exposure limit for schoolyards was raised to 20 millisieverts per year. This non-negligible value (less than the 50 millisieverts yearly limit for nuclear workers in many countries) led to a large public reaction, including the resignation of Toshiso Kosako, special adviser on nuclear matters to the Japanese Government. The government then had to "flip-flop" on the issue of radiation standards in schools, causing "continuing confusion and anguish about the safety of schoolchildren in Fukushima".

Because of radiation concerns, tens of thousands of children are being kept inside school buildings during the hot summer, where some wear masks even though the windows are kept shut. They are banned from their own school playgrounds, unable to play in local parks and kept inside by their parents. Workers are removing the surface soil from schoolyards contaminated with radioactive particles from the nuclear plant, despite often having nowhere to dump the soil, except in holes dug in the same grounds.

The results of a scientific survey conducted in March show that about 45 percent of 1,080 children in three Fukushima communities tested positive for thyroid exposure to radiation. The government has said that the levels were too low to warrant further examination.

As of September 2011, a total of 16 elementary and junior high schools in Fukushima communities remained closed.

=== Hotspots ===
In October 2011, radiation levels as high as those in the evacuation zone around Japan's Fukushima nuclear plant have been detected in a Tokyo suburb. Japanese officials said the contamination was linked to the Fukushima nuclear disaster. Contaminations levels "as high as those inside Fukushima's no-go zone have been detected, with officials speculating that the hotspot was created after radioactive caesium carried in rain water became concentrated because of a broken gutter".

In October 2011 the Japanese ministry of Science launched a telephone hotline to deal with public concerns about radiation exposure in areas outside Fukushima Prefecture. Concerned Japanese citizens had taken up a new hobby: walking with Geiger-counters through their city or village in search for all places with raised radiation levels. Whenever a site was found with a radiation dose at one meter above the ground more than one microsievert per hour and higher than nearby areas, this should be mentioned at the hotline. One microsievert per hour is the limit above this topsoil at school playgrounds would be removed, subsidized by the state of Japan. Local governments were asked to carry out simple decontamination works, such as clearing mud from ditches if necessary. When radiation levels would remain more than one microsievert higher than nearby areas even after the cleaning, the ministry offered to help with further decontamination. On the website of the ministry a guideline was posted on how to measure radiation levels in a proper way, how to hold the dosimeter and how long to wait for a proper reading.

== TEPCO response ==
There has been considerable criticism to the way the plant operator TEPCO has handled the crisis. Kuni Yogo, a former atomic energy policy planner in Japan's Science and Technology Agency and Akira Omoto, a former Tepco executive and a member of the Japanese Atomic Energy Commission both questioned Tepco's management's decisions in the crisis. Reports in the Yomiuri Shimbun portray Prime Minister Naoto Kan repeatedly ordering TEPCO to take actions such as opening steam valves with little response from the utility.

On 1 April 2011, ABC News reported that the plant's operators were "woefully unprepared for the scale of the disaster". Water is still being poured into the damaged reactors to cool melting fuel rods. John Price, a former member of the Safety Policy Unit at the UK's National Nuclear Corporation, has said that it "might be 100 years before melting fuel rods can be safely removed from Japan's Fukushima nuclear plant".

Three weeks after the beginning of the disaster in Fukushima, Spiegel Online reported how "helpless and casual" TEPCO has been in its improvised efforts to cope with the accident. The company hasn't put forward a strategy to regain control over the situation in the reactors. Helmut Hirsch, a German physicist and nuclear expert, says "they are improvising with tools that were not intended for this type of situation". There are roughly 400 workers onsite risking their lives to prevent the situation from deteriorating even further, who sleep in a building on the plant grounds. Each man has been given a blanket and they lie on the floor in hallways, in stairwells and even in front of the clogged toilets.

TEPCO could face 2 trillion yen ($23.6 bln) in special losses in the current business year to March 2012 to compensate communities near its crippled Fukushima I nuclear plant, according to JPMorgan Chase. As of June 2011, TEPCOs stock has "slumped 91 percent, erasing 3.2 trillion yen ($40 billion) in market value".

Japan plans to put TEPCO under effective state control so it can meet its compensation payments to people affected by radiation from its Fukushima I plant. Tokyo will set aside several trillion yen in public funds that TEPCO can "dip into if it runs short for payouts to people affected".

Starting at 22 March 2011 TEPCO compiled a radiation map of the surroundings of the Fukushima Daiichi nuclear power plant. At 150 spots around the buildings the radiation was monitored. This map, the governmental data provided by SPEEDI (System for Prediction of Environmental Emergency Dose Information) and the data of the Japan Meteorological Agency's were shared – the same day – to the United States and other international institutes. On 23 March, a day later, NISA was informed. Almost every day TEPCO officials and NRC staffers continued to share updated versions of the map by e-mail. The information was kept secret for the Japanese public until 24 April 2011, only after the media reported details of the map on 23 April 2011, a day earlier.

Due to frustration with TEPCO and the Japanese government "providing differing, confusing, and at times contradictory, information on critical health issues" a citizen's group called "Safecast" recorded detailed radiation level data in Japan using off-the-shelf Geiger counter equipment.

=== Leaking storage tank ===
Wednesday 19 February 2014 late in the evening a leakage was found near a storage tank with radioactive water. The water contained 230.000.000 bq/L. The water overflowed the barrier around the tank, into the grounds around it. TEPCO estimated that some 100 metric tons were lost. After the waterflow into the tank was cut off, the leakage stopped, According to TEPCO nothing was flown into the ocean nearby. Further investigations were done after the cause of the leakage. A valve was opened by error, this caused an inflow of water to the tank. Around 2 p.m. on 19 Feb. an alarm went off, indicating that the tank was dangerously filled. This alarm was ignored, because no radioactive water was transferred to the tank. The tank, however, got overfilled, and the radioactive access water left the tank along the rain-gutter. Because all rainwater is directed outside the barriers around the tanks, the overflowing radioactive water seeped directly into the grounds. According to TEPCO all leakage was due to human error. The patrols were doubled to twice a day, and the number of workers involved was increased 6 times to 60 people. Because the leak was about 700 meters from the coastal line, TEPCO believed that none of this water had reached the ocean.

On 21 February 2014 Hideka Morimoto, deputy secretary-general of the NRA, said during a news conference, that the recurring problems and the recent discovery of the 100-ton loss of highly tainted water on the Fukushima No.1 plant had raised questions at the NRA, whether TEPCO as a firm was competent enough to solve all difficulties at the plant. According to him, quote : "This will generate controversy over TEPCO's safety culture and its ability to cope as a business operator".

== Business reaction ==
On 14 March, the first full business day after the accident, Japan's Nikkei 225 stock index fell 6%, followed up by another 11% drop on 15 March after the government warned of elevated radiation risks. Likewise, plant owner TEPCO's shares fell 62% in the four days following the accident, then started a 14% recovery. However, by 29 March, TEPCO shares had fallen further, reaching a 34-year low.

There have been blackouts throughout Tokyo and eight other prefectures. These blackouts have depressed economic output and made it harder for the economy to recover from the earthquake. Due to a combination of lack of electricity and panic, Japanese car makers closed down factories, and airlines cancelled flights to Japan.

The Japanese National Strategy Minister suggested nationalizing TEPCO on 28 March; in response Secretary Edano denied that approach was being considered. On 13 April, the government considered a plan to limit TEPCO's liability to approximately 3.8 trillion yen (US$45 billion).

Some foreign firms (including SAP, Dow Chemical, IKEA, BNP Paribas, and H&M) have moved staff from Tokyo westward to Osaka or to other countries, as did some Tokyo embassies (including those of Germany, Austria, Switzerland and Denmark) move to Osaka. Some airlines (KLM, Air France, Lufthansa and Alitalia) changed destinations from Tokyo's Narita airport to Kansai airport in western Japan for some period afterward.

At an annual food safety exhibition in Tokyo held on 26 to 28 October 2011, machines were shown that could measure radiation: on conveyor belts food and other objects could be proofed by a radiation sensor, and the outcome could be read within 12 seconds. In this way a large number of objects could be checked in a very short time. Despite the huge price: 56,000 dollars, farmers, beef processors and restaurant chains showed great interest. Smaller devices to check food for radioactivity were shown, testing food placed in beakers. These could be used by smaller firms or even in households. The lowest cost of these small machines was still around 9,000 dollars.

Because of public concerns about radioactive contamination of food, Aeon, a Japanese supermarket chain, decided to publish the results of voluntary radiation tests performed on food of Japanese origin in their stores. The information was available on the website, and on posters in stores. Fish, vegetables, rice, beef and more were controlled by the shops since March 2011. All products with 50 becquerels per kilogram, one-tenth of the government's provisional limit, were rejected and not offered in stores. In the first week of November 2011 radioactive cesium was found in Pacific cod and rice from Fukushima, in tuna from Miyagi, and in bonito from Iwate. The customers were offered a list of all contaminated food that was found, its radioactivity levels and production areas.

== Anti-nuclear protests ==
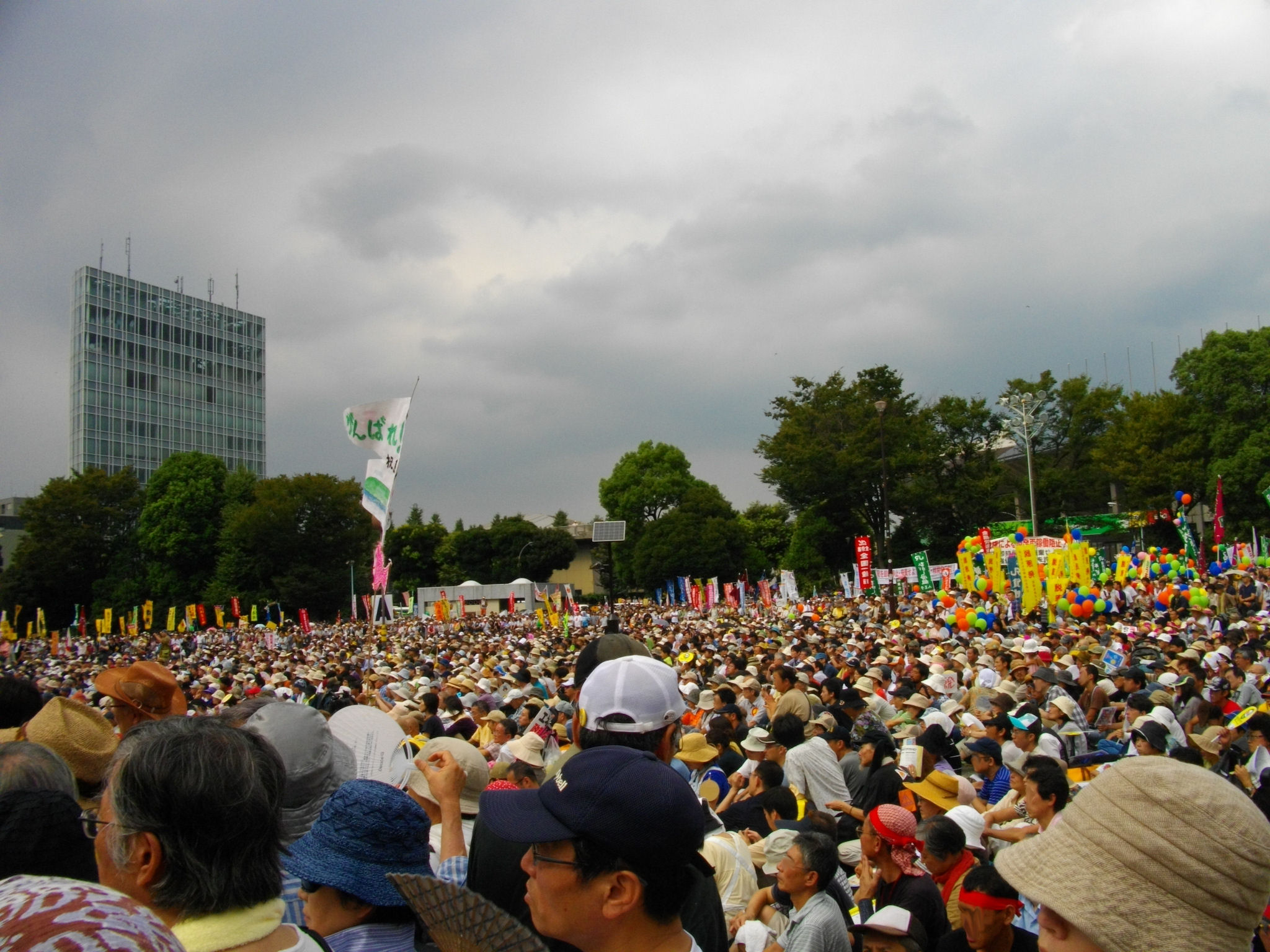
Anti-Nuclear Power Plant Rally on 19 September 2011 at Meiji Shrine complex in Tokyo

There have been many anti-nuclear protests in Japan during 2011. On 27 March at least 1000 people attended the monthly demonstration of the Japan Congress Against Atomic and Hydrogen Bombs in Tokyo after advertising on social network sites. Protesters have typically been polite and restrained, but the government is "acutely aware that public anger against nuclear power is growing", and that is forcing Japan's leaders to rethink the country's energy policies.

On March 26 two dozen Diet members signed a letter calling on the government to "immediately get young children and pregnant women out of the 30-km danger zone around the heavily damaged Fukushima No. 1 nuclear power plant". The statement also called for "extending the current 20-km mandatory evacuation zone radically to avoid further exposure and discontinuing official declarations that there is no immediate harm to human health, charging they aren't properly transmitting to the public the dangers of possible long-term radiation harm". The statement, drawn up by anti-nuclear groups, is to be delivered to Prime Minister Naoto Kan.

As of March 30 there was growing consensus that the severity of the Fukushima nuclear disaster had surpassed the Three Mile Island accident to become the world's second-worst nuclear accident. The early effects on Japanese public opinion and government policy were felt. NGOs and anti-nuclear groups gained credibility, including Greenpeace, which launched a study on the impact of the Fukushima crisis.

On March 31 an anti-nuclear activist attempted to drive into the radioactivity-leaking Fukushima I complex, and later crashed through a locked gate at the Fukushima II power plant.

In mid-April, 17,000 people protested at two demonstrations in Tokyo against nuclear power. One protester, Yohei Nakamura, said nuclear power is a serious problem and that anti-nuclear demonstrations were undercovered in the Japanese press because of the influence of the Tokyo Electric Power Co. He said that "If the mass media shows anti-nuclear-power activities like demonstrations, they risk losing TEPCO as an advertiser."

Three months after the Fukushima nuclear disaster, thousands of anti-nuclear protesters marched in Japan. Company workers, students, and parents with children rallied across Japan, "venting their anger at the government's handling of the crisis, carrying flags bearing the words 'No Nukes!' and 'No More Fukushima'." The ongoing Fukushima crisis may spell the end of nuclear power in Japan, as "citizen opposition grows and local authorities refuse permission to restart reactors that have undergone safety checks". Local authorities are skeptical that sufficient safety measures have been taken and are reticent to give their permission – now required by law – to bring suspended nuclear reactors back online. More than 60,000 people in Japan marched in demonstrations in Tokyo, Osaka, Hiroshima and Fukushima on June 11, 2011.

In July 2011, Japanese mothers, many new to political activism, have started "taking to the streets to urge the government to protect their children from radioactive material leaking from the crippled Fukushima No. 1 nuclear plant". Using social networking media, such as Facebook and Twitter, they have "organized antinuclear energy rallies nationwide attended by thousands of protesters".

In July 2011, the Hidankyo, the group representing the 10,000 or so survivors of the atomic bombings in Japan, called for the first time for the elimination of civilian nuclear power. In its action plan for 2012, the group appealed for "halting construction of new nuclear plants and the gradual phasing out of Japan’s 54 current reactors as energy alternatives are found". Sumiteru Taniguchi, director of the Nagasaki Council of A-Bomb Sufferers, has linked the Fukushima disaster to the atomic bombings of Japan:

Nuclear power and mankind cannot coexist. We survivors of the atomic bomb have said this all along. And yet, the use of nuclear power was camouflaged as 'peaceful' and continued to progress. You never know when there's going to be a natural disaster. You can never say that there will never be a nuclear accident.

In August 2011, about 2,500 people including farmers and fishermen marched in Tokyo. They are suffering heavy losses following the Fukushima nuclear disaster, and called for prompt compensation from plant operator Tokyo Electric Power Co. and the government, chanting slogans such as "TEPCO must pay compensation swiftly".

In September 2011, anti-nuclear protesters, marching to the beat of drums, "took to the streets of Tokyo and other cities to mark six months since the March earthquake and tsunami and vent their anger at the government's handling of the nuclear crisis set off by meltdowns at the Fukushima power plant". An estimated 2,500 people marched past TEPCO headquarters, and created a human chain around the building of the Trade Ministry that oversees the power industry. Protesters called for a complete shutdown of Japanese nuclear power plants and demanded a shift in government policy toward alternative sources of energy. Among the protestors were four young men who started a 10-day hunger strike to bring about change in Japan's nuclear policy.

Tens of thousands of people marched in central Tokyo in September 2011, chanting "Sayonara nuclear power" and waving banners, to call on Japan's government to abandon atomic energy in the wake of the Fukushima nuclear disaster. Author Kenzaburō Ōe, who won the Nobel Prize for literature in 1994, and has campaigned for pacifist and anti-nuclear causes addressed the crowd. Musician Ryuichi Sakamoto, who composed the score to the movie "The Last Emperor" was also among the event's supporters.

On the anniversary of the 11 March earthquake and tsunami all over Japan protesters called for the abolishment of nuclear power, and the scrapping of nuclear reactors.

- Tokyo:
  - a demonstration was held in the streets of Tokyo and the march ended in front of the headquarters of TEPCO
- Koriyama, Fukushima
  - 16,000 people were at a meeting, they walked through the city calling for the end of nuclear power.
- Shizuoka Prefecture
  - 1,100 people called for the scrapping of the Hamaoka reactors of Chubu Electric Power Co.
- Tsuruga, Fukui
  - 1,200 people marched in the streets of the city of Tsuruga, the home of the Monju fast-breeder reactor prototype and the nuclear reactors of Kansai Electric Power Co.
  - The crowd objected the restart of the reactors of the Oi-nuclear power plant. Of which NISA did approve the so-called stress-tests, after the reactors were taken out of service for a regular check-up.
- Saga city, Aomori city
  - Likewise protests were held in the cities of Saga and Aomori and at various other places hosting nuclear facilities.
- Nagasaki and Hiroshima
  - Anti-nuclear protesters and atomic-bomb survivors marched together and demanded that Japan should end its dependency on nuclear power.

== Political reaction ==
On 23 March 2011, ten days after the hydrogen explosions, the recommendations of the Nuclear Safety Commission of Japan to protect the people living near the exploded Fukushima reactors were put aside by the Japanese government. The proposed measures were based on the results provided by a computer program named SPEEDI (System for Prediction of Environmental Emergency Dose Information). This program was specially designed to predict the spread of radioactive materials after a nuclear accident. The proposed measurements included evacuations and administering iodine tablets to people to minimize their intake of radioactive iodine. However, the office of the Prime Minister decided that ten days after the explosions it was too late, and did not act on the proposals. These facts came to light in the first weeks of December 2011, when a government panel examined the details about the delay in utilizing the data produced by SPEEDI.

Prime Minister Naoto Kan's ruling party suffered embarrassing losses in April local elections after the Japanese leader came under fire over the nuclear disaster, further weakening his influence and bolstering rivals who want him to quit once the crisis ends.

Fukushima Governor Yūhei Satō refused to meet former TEPCO president Masataka Shimizu on two occasions due to his anger at the utility's handling of the disaster. Shimizu later resigned.

Problems in stabilizing the Fukushima Daiichi nuclear plant have hardened attitudes to nuclear power. As of June 2011, "more than 80 percent of Japanese now say they are anti-nuclear and distrust government information on radiation". The ongoing Fukushima crisis may spell the end of nuclear power in Japan, as "citizen opposition grows and local authorities refuse permission to restart reactors that have undergone safety checks". Local authorities are skeptical that sufficient safety measures have been taken and are reticent to give their permission – now required by law – to bring suspended nuclear reactors back online.

Prime Minister Naoto Kan took an increasingly anti-nuclear stance in the months following the Fukushima disaster. In May, he ordered the aging Hamaoka Nuclear Power Plant be closed over earthquake and tsunami fears, and he said he would freeze plans to build new reactors. In July 2011, Kan said that "Japan should reduce and eventually eliminate its dependence on nuclear energy in what would be a radical shift in the country’s energy policy, saying that the Fukushima accident had demonstrated the dangers of the technology". Kan said Japan should abandon plans to build 14 new reactors by 2030. He wants to "pass a bill to promote renewable energy and questioned whether private companies should be running atomic plants".

Benjamin K. Sovacool has said that, with the benefit of hindsight, the Fukushima disaster was entirely avoidable in that Japan could have chosen to exploit the country's extensive renewable energy base. The biggest positive result of the Fukushima Daiichi nuclear disaster could be renewed public support for the commercialization of renewable energy technologies. In August 2011, the Japanese Government passed a bill to subsidize electricity from renewable energy sources. The legislation will become effective on July 1, 2012, and require utilities to buy electricity generated by renewable sources including solar power, wind power and geothermal energy at above-market rates.

In March 2012, Prime Minister Yoshihiko Noda acknowledged that the government shared the blame for the Fukushima disaster, saying that officials had been blinded by a false belief in the country's "technological infallibility", and were all too steeped in a "safety myth". Mr. Noda said "Everybody must share the pain of responsibility".

=== Investigations in the Japanese Lower House ===
The special committee of the Japanese Lower House investigating the Fukushima disaster had requested to TEPCO to submit its procedural manuals for accidents by the end of the whole first week of September. But when the accident manuals were submitted to the Diet committee most of the contents was blacked out and heavily redacted. On 12 September 3 pages were presented, including a cover sheet, containing an index of actions to be taken in serious accidents. Most of the index was blacked out and TEPCO did collect the papers immediately after the meeting, explaining that this was restricted information with copyrights, that was not allowed to be made public. The special committee did ask the industry ministry to order the utility to resubmit the manuals in their original form, as required by law. NISA said it would consider what actions to take.

As of September 2011, there is a complex power struggle underway over the future of nuclear energy in Japan involving political, governmental, industry, and union groups. Despite the seriousness of the Fukushima crisis, Japan's "historical commitment to nuclear power – and a fuel cycle that includes reprocessing and breeder reactors – still has powerful supporters".

In February 2012, an independent investigation into the accident by the Rebuild Japan Initiative Foundation said that "In the darkest moments of last year’s nuclear accident, Japanese leaders did not know the actual extent of damage at the plant and secretly considered the possibility of evacuating Tokyo, even as they tried to play down the risks in public".

=== New legal restrictions for exposure to radiation proposed ===
On 6 October 2011 a government panel proposed to ease the legal restrictions for exposure to radiation in the contaminated areas with radioactive fallout, because in their opinion it would be extremely difficult to limit exposure below the legal limit of 1 millisievert per year. Instead the target should be set between 1 and 20 millisieverts in line with the recommendations by the International Commission for Radiological Protection. Targets should be lowered in steps as decontamination proceeded. Targets might differ by region and residents should have a voice in setting the targets.

=== Request for decommissioning the Tokai Daini Power plant ===
On 11 October 2011 Tatsuya Murakami, the mayor of the village Tokai, said in a meeting with minister Goshi Hosono, that the Tokai Daini reactor, situated 110 kilometers from Tokyo, should be decommissioned, because the plant was more than 30 years old and the people had lost confidence in the nuclear safety commission of the government.

=== Fukushima wants all 10 nuclear reactors scrapped ===
The assembly of Fukushima Prefecture has adopted a motion that asks for the scrapping of all 10 nuclear reactors in the prefecture. The majority vote was on Thursday 20 October 2011, after the petition was submitted by a civic group in June. The petition urged the decommissioning of all reactors run by TEPCO in the prefecture—six at the Daiichi plant and four at the Daini plant. This was the first time in Japan that a prefecture hosting nuclear plants has voted to adopt such a petition. Although TEPCO was planning to decommission four reactors at the Fukushima Daiichi plant, TEPCO still had detailed plans to exploit the remaining six reactors.

=== TEPCO request for government compensation ===
In his answer to TEPCO, after its request of 120 billion yen in government compensation, the minister of Industry Yukio Edano told TEPCO on 24 October 2011 to cut "at least" 2.5 trillion yen in its costs over the coming 10 years before TEPCO would receive any funds to help it to pay the compensations over the nuclear crisis at its Fukushima Daiichi power plant. This target was the outcome of a report from an independent commission that the Japanese government received on 3 October, in it their thoughts about how TEPCO's special business plan should be compiled as a precondition to receive financial aid from a state-backed body set up to help it meet its massive compensation obligations. Next to cost-cutting this special business plan would also include restructuring measurements. First plan would be an "emergency" plan, and the second plan should have a "comprehensive" character. This last plan should be completed in spring 2012.

=== At least 1 trillion yen needed for decontamination ===
In October 2011, Japanese Prime Minister Yoshihiko Noda said the government will spend at least 1 trillion yen ($13 billion) to clean up vast areas contaminated by radiation from the Fukushima nuclear disaster. Japan "faces the prospect of removing and disposing 29 million cubic meters of soil from a sprawling area in Fukushima, located 240 kilometers (150 miles) northeast of Tokyo, and four nearby prefectures".

=== Japanese nuclear reactors taken offline ===
On 28 October 2011, of the 55 nuclear reactors in Japan, 44 were taken off the grid, in most instances to undergo safety inspections. Stress-tests demanded by the Japanese government were performed at 18 reactors. Of the reactors still in operation, four more would be closed down before the end of 2011, and the rest would follow in the first months of 2012. Because the disaster had raised serious safety concerns among local authorities, and they were reluctant to give permission to restart, only two reactors were eventually restarted, both at the Ohi facility. On September 14, 2013, those reactors were shut down, leaving all 50 Japanese commercial nuclear reactors closed.

An energy white paper, approved by the Japanese Cabinet in October 2011, says "public confidence in safety of nuclear power was greatly damaged" by the Fukushima disaster, and calls for a reduction in the nation's reliance on nuclear power. It also omits a section on nuclear power expansion that was in last year's policy review.

=== Extra staff members for Kyiv embassy ===
On 30 October 2011 the Japanese government took up the plan to increase the 30 members of the staff at the Japanese embassy in Kyiv, Ukraine to 36. For the first time two nuclear experts and three interpreters will be stationed here. In order to learn from the experience of this country with the 1986 Chernobyl nuclear catastrophe. In this way Japan hoped to build on good relations between the two countries, also because growing numbers of Japanese officials were visiting Ukraine at that moment. The new staff was expected to gather information about handling a no-go zone, the removal of radioactive materials, and how to deal with internal exposure to radiation. People affected by the Chernobyl disaster would also be questioned. The embassy was equipped with dosimeters and protection outfits for field studies. The extra costs of the additional embassy staff was estimated at 200 million yen.

=== Energy debate changed in Japan ===
Long one of the world's most committed promoters of civilian nuclear power, the trauma of the Fukushima disaster has changed attitudes in Japan. Political and energy experts describe "nothing short of a nationwide loss of faith, not only in Japan's once-vaunted nuclear technology but also in the government, which many blame for allowing the accident to happen".

According to The Japan Times, the Fukushima nuclear disaster changed the national debate over energy policy almost overnight. "By shattering the government's long-pitched safety myth about nuclear power, the crisis dramatically raised public awareness about energy use and sparked strong anti-nuclear sentiment". A June 2011 Asahi Shimbun poll of 1,980 respondents found that 74 percent answered "yes" to whether Japan should gradually decommission all 54 reactors and become nuclear free.

=== 40 year limit for lifespan of nuclear reactors ===
On 6 January 2012 the Japanese government proposed a maximum lifespan for nuclear reactors of 40 years. This was one of many proposals that nuclear crisis minister Goshi Hosono announced to review the nuclear safety regulations for nuclear reactors and nuclear fuel material. This was the first time that the Japanese government had tried to regulate the lifespan of nuclear power plants. When safety and maintenance of the plant meet regulatory guidelines, the operator could request for an extension. Safety standards against earthquakes, tsunamis and other disasters would be revised with the new knowledge and technology in protective measures. Power companies were to comply with the new standards. Approval of the new law by the parliament was scheduled not before the end of January 2012, but ahead of the installation of the new nuclear safety agency in April 2012.

=== Meeting with two ministers boycotted by mayors ===
On 26 February 2012 a meeting with Goshi Hosono, minister of Environment, and Tatsuo Hirano, minister in charge of reconstruction, and the mayors of eight cities and villages near the Fukushima Daiichi nuclear plant was cancelled. Three mayors boycotted the meeting in a protest, because the government had already informed the media about the meeting's agenda prior to informing them. Katsutaka Idogawa, the mayor of Futaba, told a press conference, "I strongly mistrust the government... So I have made a momentous decision not to attend the meeting" The mayors of the towns of Hirono and Namie also refused to go. This meeting was intended to discuss how to get rid of the radioactive material emitted by the plant and find a place for temporary facilities to store contaminated soil. The meeting was cancelled, instead Hosono and Hirano had an informal discussion with the five remaining municipal leaders.

=== Food aid used to lower fears for contaminated food abroad ===
To overcome public fears over contaminated food, Japan planned to supply food aid to the U.N. World Food Program. On 16 March 2011 the agreement was signed. Food products from disaster-hit eastern Japan would be used as overseas aid, in an attempt to lower the fears of radioactive contamination. For this a supplementary budget of 1 billion yen for the year 2011 was made available. Canned fish products produced in the prefectures Aomori, Iwate, Ibaraki and Chiba, certified and controlled for radioactive contamination – would be sent to Cambodia and developing countries, to be used to feed schoolchildren. With this Japan planned to subsidize the fishing industry in the disaster-hit region, and hoped to revive the export of their products.

=== Okuma asked to be declared as no-go zone ===
On 28 March 2012 mayor Toshitsuna Watanabe of the town Okuma said during a meeting of the municipal assembly held at its temporary town office in Aizuwakamatsu that he will ask the whole town to be designated as no-go area, where it is unlikely that residents will be able to return in any foreseeable future, because he did not want the community of the town divided. Likewise the town Futaba considered refusing any re-designation of the evacuation zones in the town.

=== Postponement of analog television shutdown in Fukushima ===
The five television stations licensed to the cities of Fukushima and Koriyama (NHK Fukushima, FCT, KFB, TV-U Fukushima, and Fukushima Television) were originally scheduled to shut down their analog signals on 24 July 2011. However, a month prior to the scheduled date, the Japanese senate postponed the analog shutdown in Fukushima and the prefectures of Iwate and Miyagi to the north. Television stations in all three prefectures shut off their analog signals at noon on 31 March 2012.

=== No-return zone ===
At a meeting on 3 April 2012 in Futaba with Mayor Katsutaka Idogawa and Governor Yuhei Sato of Fukushima, minister Tatsuo Hirano of Reconstruction made a few personal remarks about the possibility that some places around the Fukushima nuclear power plant could be designated a no-return zone. One of the reasons he gave was the large number of storage tanks holding highly contaminated water that was used to cool the damaged reactors. As of May 30, 2013, "a wide area around" the Fukushima nuclear plant continues to show radiation contamination above 50 millisieverts, and that includes 96% of the town of Futaba where all of its 6,520 residents were evacuated.

=== Evacuation zone partially lifted ===
On 1 April 2012 the evacuation orders for the villages Kawauchi and Tamura were lifted, on 15 April the people of Minamisoma were able to return to their homes. A ceremony was held for police and volunteers, who were to patrol the borders of the no-go areas. The checkpoints 20 kilometers from the reactors were moved to about 10 kilometers. Three new evacuation zones were planned by the government in areas within 11 villages and towns according to radiation levels. The small city of Minamisoma was divided into 3 zones, in the first people were free to go in and out, in the second access is limited, the third area all visiting is forbidden. Still scattered with ruins, and with no electricity and running water, the city was a rather uninhabitable place for a population formed by mostly elderly people. Schools and hospitals remained closed.

On 11 April 2012 a meeting was organised by the Japanese government to inform the people of Naraha, Fukushima about the wish to lift the evacuation order for the city of Naraha. Almost all territory of Naraha was situated within the 20 kilometer zone, and the people would be able to return to their former homes, because local maximum radiation doses would be 20 millisieverts per year. Deputy head of the Cabinet's Nuclear Emergency Response Headquarters Kensuke Tomita, who represented the government at the meeting, was overwhelmed by all the questions and angry remarks of the local people attending the meeting. At the end he promised that: "TEPCO and the government will take responsibility for restoring local infrastructure, decontamination and (nuclear disaster) compensation." But at this moment the city government had given up the possibility for re-designation before March. On 16 April the governor of Fukushima Yuhei Sato said at the Nuclear Emergency Response Headquarters, that the people of Fukushima were frightened by all the problems with the nuclear plant, and persisted that the government would take control.

== Decontamination ==
On 23 June 2013 during a meeting with evacuees from the Miyakoji district of Tamura, Fukushima Prefecture and central government officials, the announcement was made that the residents would be allowed to return to their homes in mid-August 2013, although the radiation levels in residential areas still ranged between 0.32 and 0.54 microsieverts per hour, much higher than the government's goal of 0.23 microsieverts per hour. However, decontamination efforts in the Miyakoji district were declared completed. When asked, the officials refused to prolong the decontamination efforts, arguing that exposure to radiation would differ for every person. The 0.23 microsievert per hour limit would lead to an accumulated radiation exposure exceeding 1 millisievert for people that would stay outdoors for eight hours a day. Instead the officials offered the evacuees a new type of dosimeter so that they could check their own radiation exposures, and in this way take responsibility for their own safety. Although billions of yen were spent in an effort to decontaminate some areas around the troubled nuclear plant, the effort was described as futile, and radioactive waste was not collected properly and disposed of, and sometimes dumped into rivers. Tomohiko Hideta, an official of the Reconstruction Agency, said that it would be impossible to reach the official targets, and confirmed the offer of the dosimeters. However, spokesmen for the Japanese Ministry of Environment denied all, even when they were confronted with the existence of audio recordings of the meeting that proved otherwise.

== Monitoring the impact of radiation-exposure on the health of residents ==
On 4 November 2011 in the city of Hamamatsu, Goshi Hosono, minister in charge of the nuclear crisis, made a remark about plans to set up a study regarding the health consequences of radiation levels of about 20 millisieverts per year. Studies done after nuclear accidents in the past suggested that radiation levels of more than 100 millisieverts at once would have negative effects on human health, but negative effects from lower levels were never found. The Japanese government hoped to be able to accept 20 millisieverts per year as below the limit harmful to human health. Notwithstanding that corrected analyses of Hiroshima and Nagasaki bombing victims, and the six-decade "Mouse House" studies at Oak Ridge National Laboratory, had shown that exposures below 700 mSv per year are actually beneficial, this exposure limit is recommended by the International Commission for Radiological Protection. Concerning the government project of disposing of debris in areas outside northeastern Japan, Hosono said that rubble from Iwate and Miyagi was not radioactive, burning the rubble was harmless, and the ashes would be disposed of safely. Local governments would be asked for cooperation, with the national government ensuring safety and taking overall responsibility .

On 20 December the Ministry of Environment announced an extra program to monitor the impact of radiation exposure on children born to mothers in Fukushima Prefecture, to find links between the mothers' radiation exposure and congenital abnormalities, asthma, allergies or other diseases of their children. The checks would stop when the children reach the age of 13. No health effects of this nature are expected to rise as a result of the incident.

On 15 April 2012 the city of Namie, Fukushima asked the Japanese government for free healthcare for its residents. To monitor long-term health, the city would provide to all inhabitants health handbooks, in order to keep a thorough record of all health checks and thyroid examinations. The health books followed the structure of those used to monitor the health of the atomic bomb survivors in Hiroshima and Nagasaki. These "hibakusha" health books were free from medical fees, and Namie asked the government to set up a similar program for the people in Namie. Of the seven other cities around the nuclear plant, Futaba was also willing to take part in this program.

In April 2012 the government of the evacuated city of Namie bought a whole-body dosimeter. The device was installed in a temporary housing in Nihonmatsu, Fukushima, in order to monitor the internal radiation exposure and the health of the citizens of Namie. Some 50 people a day could be examined, a complete screening would take two minutes per person. Initial screenings of the whole population was planned to be finished at the end of the fiscal year 2012. In this way the government of Namie wanted to offer a long-term monitoring program to the population. Another reason for this was excessive exposure to radiation during the first days directly after the nuclear disaster in March 2011, when predictions from SPEEDI were ignored by the Fukushima Prefectural government.

On 5 June 2013 12 children were diagnosed with thyroid cancer, and 15 others were suspected of having the disease. Four members of the panel that accompanied the screening stepped down that day. Among the new members were Shuji Shimizu, professor at Fukushima University (involved with nuclear-related payouts) and Shinji Tokonami, professor at Hirosaki University, who had done the health screening in the town of Namie. In an attempt to regain public trust, after it became known that secret meetings were held to "harmonize the opinions of the panel-members". In addition the panel said that its goal had been changed from "alleviating the anxiety of the residents" to "maintaining and promoting the health of prefectural residents into the future." Because this was the first large-scale survey in this field, comparisons could not made. The government of Fukushima Prefecture provided the results of the testing and a list of the patients to the panel, which it had previously refused to do in order to protect the privacy of the patients.

== Testing school lunches ==
On the end of March 2012 a survey of Kyodo News revealed that, due to fears for contamination with radioactive fallout, 44 of 74 major towns in Japan were testing school lunches or food-components for radioactive cesium. In eastern Japan a majority of 34 out of 42 towns had started with these tests, after the government had ordered testing in 17 prefectures around the Fukushima-plant.

In other parts of Japan, testing was left free to decide whether to test school lunches. But already 10 out of 32 towns had implemented similar tests, while at this date Morioka, Akita and four other towns had plans to start testing. Some cities did not test themselves, they relied on the safety of the food because pre-shipment tests conducted by producers.

Although after 1 April 2012 the Japanese government lowered the legal standard for radioactive cesium-levels down to 100 becquerels/kg, some cities decided to lower the standard even further:

- no detection : Tottori
- 4 becquerels/kg: Sapporo
- 10 becquerels/kg:Yamagata
- 40 becquerels/kg: Fukui, Adachi, Sumida
- 50 becquerels/kg: Kyoto

Other towns like Fukushima, Matsuyama and the Bunkyo Ward school in Tokyo planned to demand for lower than legal levels.

== Stress-tests ==
On 8 November the Japanese government published the first results of nuclear safety tests at the website of NISA. This was done to boost transparency before laid-off reactors were restarted. The minister of industry Yukio Edano asked the public to respond with remarks and questions about the tests, and promised to respond to this all. He hoped, that this would lead to a better understanding of the nuclear safety procedures.

== Debris disposal ==
Nine months after the disaster of 11 March it proved increasingly difficult to dispose all the debris and rubble. In April 572 municipalities were willing to accept the debris, but in the latest survey done by the Ministry of Environment on 7 October only 54 municipalities in 11 prefectures were willing to consider acceptance, and only six places had already taken in parts of the debris. Fear for radioactive contamination was thought to be the cause for this. The ministry declined to identify the municipalities that have agreed, or refused, to accept the debris. Some 4.88 million tons of rubble were needed to be disposed of a year after the quake. Around 20.5 million tons was collected in Iwate and Miyagi, all was stored at multiple temporary storage sites. The debris from Fukushima would be stored within this prefecture. On 2 November 30 tons of debris was loaded on train, and sent to Tokyo by rail from the city of Miyako, Iwate. The first train carrying the debris would arrive in Tokyo on 4 November. This made Tokyo the first local government outside Japan's northeast to accept debris.

=== Interim Storage facility ===
On 28 December at a meeting in the city of Fukushima minister Goshi Hosono asked the local leaders of prefecture Fukushima for permission to build an interim storage facility somewhere in the county of Futaba near the two villages hosting the Fukushima Daiichi Nuclear Power Plant.

Local residents, however, were seriously divided. Those who would like to return to their houses, were afraid, that an interim-storage might prove to be a very permanent storage, and would make any return impossible. But others had already accepted the fact, that the radiation-levels around their former houses would be too high, and would make living there impractical for a long time. Some local residents realized that without the interim storage facility, there would no place to dispose radioactive waste at all, and the construction of the facility would create also new jobs.

Local leaders were willing to accept the new waste-storage, but in the meantime they were reluctant, because the anger of some of their citizens and the fact that the presence of it, could hamper all efforts to decontaminate the area and would make repopulation impossible. Therefore, they requested an insurance from the government, that the storage would be closed after 30 years.

== Public reaction ==
The news of the contamination of foods with radioactive substances leaking from the Fukushima nuclear reactors damaged the mutual trust between local food producers including farmers and consumers. Everywhere in Japan banners and stickers were found with: "Hang in there, Fukushima!", numerous harmful rumors on Fukushima products could be found online. Many rumors that were discriminatory to Fukushima and other messages slandering Fukushima people could be found on the Internet. The source of cesium was found to be rice straw that had been feed to the animal. But a notice of the Japanese government that was sent to cattle-farmers after the nuclear accident made no mention to the possibility that rice straw could be contaminated with radioactive materials from the plant.

Media coverage of the event has been described as taking an "irrational approach which generated the worst of humanity" because many anti-nuclear groups tried to make political points out of the issue. In addition, the main story should have been on the 19,000 people killed by the tsunami and the thousands of missing individuals. However, public attention was drawn away from the needs of major restructuring, housing, developing the transportation system, and helping people who suffered because of the tsunami. At the same time, a study by Nakamura "found a continued willingness to participate in social learning processes and in citizen deliberations that may have been triggered by the 2011 disaster" and which "apparently contradicts the evidence of a decaying psychological half-life of Fukushima memories observed in TV programmes."

David Spiegelhalter of Cambridge University explained that the psychological effects of the media coverage include increased feelings of risk and vulnerability. Others have warned of harmful psychological consequences of such coverage. Researchers from King's College London's Institute of Psychiatry and the Behavioural Science team at the Health Protection Agency (HPA) found that a third of people experienced high levels of anger, anxiety, and distress. The German media in particular, has been accused of scaremongering and misleading the public on the safety of nuclear power.

=== Public Support for Nuclear Power Before and After Fukushima ===
Wouter Poortinga et al. authored a study in 2013 utilizing surveys on public perceptions of climate change and energy futures. The surveys, taken in Japan and Britain, were conducted between 2005 and 2011, both before and after the Fukushima Daiichi disaster. The Japanese were found to have weaker support for nuclear power than the British, and this only increased in the wake of the 2011 meltdown. Furthermore, the Japanese public were less accepting of the construction of new nuclear power plants, even if it were to improve energy security in the country and tackle climate change. Conditional support for nuclear power in Japan dropped from about 31% in 2007 to just over 20% in 2011.

== Judicial actions against restarting nuclear powerplants ==
In August 2011 citizens of the prefecture Shiga, at the banks of Lake Biwa, started a lawsuit at the Otsu District Court, and asked a court order to prevent the restart of seven reactors operated by Kansai Electric Power Company, in the prefecture Fukui.

On 8 November 2011 a group of 40 citizens of Otsu prefecture Kyodo started a similar lawsuit at the Otsu District Court against Japan Atomic Power Company. They asked for a provisional court order to delay the restart of the two reactors at the Tsuruga Nuclear Power Plant in the city of Tsuruga. The plaintiffs argued that:

- Lake Biwa could be contaminated if a nuclear accident occurred at the plant
- The whole region of Kansai is dependent on this, the biggest lake of Japan, because it is the source of drinking water for the whole region
- an accident would endanger the health of all residents
- the Tsuruga plant is built on a site with a fault below it and a severe accident could occur during an earthquake
- the No. 1 reactor had been more than 40 years in service since it was first operational in 1970, and the Tsuruga plant was insufficiently protected against tsunamis.
- the ongoing regular checks were done under the government's safety and technological standards, and the nuclear crisis in Fukushima had proven that those regulations were insufficient.
- the reactors should remain shut down until the cause of the disaster in Fukushima would be fully investigated
- the regular checks should be performed under the new safety standards.

The operator of the plant did not want to make any comment to the press. At that time the two reactors of the plant were shut down for regular checkups. But the four-month inspection of the No. 2 reactor could be completed in December, and the checkup of reactor 1 could be completed in March 2012.

On 27 December 2011 a lawsuit was started against Kyūshū Electric Power Company by 290 local residents. Most of them living in the prefectures Saga and Fukuoka. They said that the disaster in Fukushima had made it clear, that an accident at the Genkai-plant caused by a possible earthquake or tsunami could damage the lives and health of the people living nearby. They questioned in particular the safety of the 36-year-old nr. 1 reactor near the sea. Kyushu Electric commented, that it would examine the suit and would act "appropriately." This was already the third time that locals tried to stop this plant. Because in July 2011 90 people asked the local court for an injunction order to stop the nr. 2 and nr. 3 Genkai-reactors from going back online, like was done in August 2010 when about 130 local residents and others demanded from the district court to halt to the use of plutonium-uranium mixed oxide fuel, or MOX, at the No. 3 Genkai-reactor.

In January 2012 a lawsuit was filed against the Japanese government and Kyushu Electric Power Co. at the Saga District Court by about 1,700 people from all over Japan. The complaint mentioned that after the Fukushima disaster the safety myth regarding nuclear reactors was proven to be false, and under the Japanese Constitution everybody in Japan should live without fear. On 12 March 2012 the total of people complaining was already more than 3000, when 1370 people joined the plaintiffs. Another group was planning to file another suit to seek suspension of yet another nuclear power plant run by the same company. According to Akira Hasegawa, the leader of the plaintiffs and former president of Saga University it looked possible to him raising the number of plaintiffs to 10.000.

=== Criminal charges against NISA, NSA and TEPCO ===
On 14 March 2012 two groups of citizens had taken up the plan to file criminal complaints against officials of TEPCO and governmental agencies for professional negligence in the Fukushima nuclear disaster. On 9 March in the town of Iwaki they had held a demonstration to mobilize at least 1000 people in the area of Fukushima to join in, because round 15 May the complaint would be filed at the office of the Fukushima District Public Prosecutors. In this complaint officials of the governmental Nuclear Safety Commission of Japan, NISA and TEPCO would be accused of criminal conduct and neglect resulting in the failure to prevent the nuclear crisis.

As a result, many people were exposed to radiation, patients dies because they needed to flee from their hospital, The group considered to accuse the officials of imposing health hazards through the spread of massive amounts of radioactive substances.

The 58-year-old member of the Iwaki municipal assembly and leader of the group, Kazuyoshi Sato said, he believed it was "nonsense that nobody has been held criminally responsible for causing a major nuclear accident. I'd like to call on as many Fukushima people as possible, including those who are taking shelter in areas outside of the prefecture, to join our action."

According to lawyer Yukuo Yasuda in the complaint TEPCO would be charged for not taking all necessary precautions against a possible tsunami, although studies had pointed out that there had been this kind of tsunamis in this region in the past. NISA and NSA were accused of neglect because they did not instruct TEPCO to implement the necessary measures.

== Criminal investigations ==
On 22 May 2012 the 33-year-old Makoto Owada, a high-ranking gang-member of the Sumiyoshi-kai yakuza group was arrested. Workers supplied by a network of companies and subcontractors were forced to pay substantial portions of their earnings to the subcontracting companies and Owada. Investigators learned that already in 2007 Owada was dispatching workers at the nuclear power plant construction sites in various areas. According to the police, it was needed to cut off all gang-funding, to prevent the flow of tax-money to yakuza-gangs.

== Scientific reaction ==
On 25 October 2011 the university of Hiroshima disclosed a plan to train the staff of the Japan Red Cross staff in how to respond to nuclear disasters like the one in Fukushima. The papers were to be signed on 26 October 2011. The president Toshimasa Asahara of the university said, he hoped that the university staff would also learn from the experience of the Red Cross in the care for disaster-disasters, including those in other countries. The University of Hiroshima University did establish a leading research center into the effects of radiation on the human body and health: the Research Institute for Radiation, Biology and Medicine, due to decades lasting studies after the effects on local population, that survived the atomic-explosion of Hiroshima in 1945.

The Fukushima accident exposed some troubling nuclear safety issues:

Despite the resources poured into analyzing crustal movements and having expert committees determine earthquake risk, for instance, researchers never considered the possibility of a magnitude-9 earthquake followed by a massive tsunami. The failure of multiple safety features on nuclear power plants has raised questions about the nation's engineering prowess. Government flip-flopping on acceptable levels of radiation exposure confused the public, and health professionals provided little guidance. Facing a dearth of reliable information on radiation levels, citizens armed themselves with dosimeters, pooled data, and together produced radiological contamination maps far more detailed than anything the government or official scientific sources ever provided.

== Financial liability ==
Under Japanese law the operator is liable for nuclear damage regardless of culpability except in cases of exceptionally grave natural disasters and insurrection. Government spokesman Edano said this exception would be "impossible under current social circumstances".

Reactor operation is prohibited unless the operator concludes a private contract of liability insurance as well as an indemnity agreement with the government for damage not covered by private insurance. An amount of coverage of 120 billion yen per installation is required. The Japan Atomic Energy Insurance Pool does not cover damage caused by earthquakes and tsunamis. If damage exceeds the amount of coverage, the government may give the operator the aid required to compensate the damage, if authorized by the Japanese Diet. On 13 April, the government considered a plan to limit TEPCO's liability to approximately 3.8 trillion yen (US$45 billion).

== Economics ==
On 9 November 2011 the ministry of Finance reported that since the disaster in March 2011, due to rising energy costs, high oil-prices, and the need to replace the loss of nuclear power the current account surplus had fallen 21.4 percent to 20.4 billion dollars compared with the year 2010. A decline of seven months in-a-row. The trade balance had also fallen by 59 percent year-on-year to a surplus of about 4.8 billion dollars. The strong yen made the export of electronic components difficult. Through higher returns on overseas investments, however, the income account surplus rose 12.9 percent to nearly 18 billion dollars. Compared with 2010 the balance of international payments had shrunk 46.8 percent.

Even though Japan saw a fall in manufacturing output for 2011, there was an increased use of fossil fuels for power generation, and this was the main driving force behind a rise in Japanese greenhouse gas emissions. Ministry of the Environment figures for 2011 show total greenhouse gas emissions of 1300 million tonnes of CO_{2} equivalent – 49 million tonnes more than in 2010 (a 3.9% increase).

== Technical developments ==
On 29 March 2012 a prototype of a new camera was presented by Japan Aerospace Exploration Agency (JAXA) and the Japan Atomic Energy Agency (JAEA) for the detection of gamma radiation. Images were made with a wide angle lens, the amount of contamination was presented in six different colors, the highest concentrations were red, after this yellow, green and purple. The camera was tested in February on different locations in Fukushima, the very accurate images of the contamination had already proven it effectiveness in the decontamination effort.

== Compensation payments ==
=== The Nuclear Damage Liability Facilitation Fund ===
On 21 October the president of TEPCO Toshio Nishizawa said that his company hoped to avoid capital injections from the Nuclear Damage Liability Facilitation Fund, a foundation of the Japanese government. TEPCO would need financial aid from this fund to be able to pay the huge compensation payments due to the nuclear disaster at its Fukushima nuclear power plants. At a press-conference in Tokyo Nishizawa made the following remarks:

"We would like to properly conduct compensation by receiving financial assistance, while also taking rationalization measures to turn around management and keep on going as a private company, I think it's the best option for all to avoid capital injection as much as possible."

TEPCO might claim in October 2011 the sum of 120 billion yen of government compensation for the nuclear accident, this is the maximum amount set by a contract between the government and TEPCO. Compensation payments to people and companies that suffered damages through the crisis at that date already exceeded 150 billion yen. These compensation payments could rise up to 4.54 trillion yen (4,500,000,000,000 yen or around 59 billion US dollar) by March 2013, as was revealed by a report made by a commission of the Japanese government According to an estimate by a report compiled by a government panel, compensation payments could reach 4.54 trillion yen by March 2013. Special Government bonds, that carry no interest but could be cashed when necessary, would raise the money needed. The fund has also the right to make capital injections to TEPCO by subscribing shares. In close cooperation with this fund Tepco tried to seek financial backup for the future.

At January 2013 TEPCO announced, that it needed more money to be able to pay compensations to the victims. At that moment the cost were estimated at Y3.24 trillion ($38 billion), up Y697 billion since March 2012, when the last calculation was made. In October 2011, seven months after the disaster the first assumption had been Y1.1 trillion. Since then, TEPCO already received Y1.5 billion financial aid, but the cost tripled. Besides the compensation costs, TEPCO would need some Y10 trillion to dismantle the reactors and clean up the radioactive polluted areas.

=== Compensation criteria for former residents of the evacuation zones ===
In February 2012 new restitution standards were set by the Japanese government center for settling disputes over compensation for nuclear accidents for the ongoing Fukushima nuclear crisis:

TEPCO was ordered to pay:

- to every person that was told to leave their home in accordance with official evacuation advisories.
  - 100,000 yen per month
  - after 7 months this amount should not be halved, as initially was planned.
- to all people that evacuated on their own initiative:
  - the costs of transportation
  - the costs of accommodation expenses in excess of the amounts listed by the interim guidelines set by the government's Dispute Reconciliation Committee for Nuclear Damage
    - 400,000 yen for children and expecting mothers
    - 80,000 yen for all others.

TEPCO is also required to pay compensation for any damage caused by the nuclear disaster to properties in evacuation zones, even without on-site checks to confirm the properties' conditions.

The government of prefecture Fukushima was notified that in some areas the former residents would not be permitted to return, because there was no prospect that decontamination could be completed in any foreseeable future.

Settling the claims filed by evacuees about compensation, proved to be very difficult. Because TEPCO did refuse to respond to victims' claims, that their residences and other properties were worthless after the crisis. From 900 claims filed less than 10 claims were settled at the end of February 2012, despite all efforts of more than 150 lawyers, mediators and inspectors. In general, tort law and "compensation theories which have been developed by handling traffic accidents are to be used as reference to a relatively large degree" in assessing compensation for evacuees, which has been criticized for not adequately meeting the degree of pain and suffering caused. In response, some legal analysts have suggested that new categories of compensation including "the ‘loss of home and hometown’ (furusato sōshitsu) and the ‘fear of being contaminated by radiation’ (hōshasen hibaku no kyōfu)" should be recognized.

=== Compensation criteria for the tourist industry ===
On 26 October 2011 TEPCO revised its criteria in calculating the damage suffered by tourist businesses after the crisis. Initial calculations by TEPCO included a deduction of 20 percent of the calculated losses. In the first announcement on 21 September 2011 TEPCO said that this 20 percent was thought to be caused not by radiation fears, but through the impact of the earthquake and the tsunami that followed. The new criteria offered two options:

- 10 percent reduction, no limit to the period.
- 20 percent reduction, but the period is shortened to 31 May 2011, between the first of June and 31 August the rate would be zero. The first criteria were based on data on the 1995 Great Hanshin earthquake that hit Kobe and surrounding area, this provoked much opposition.

== Alternate energy sources ==
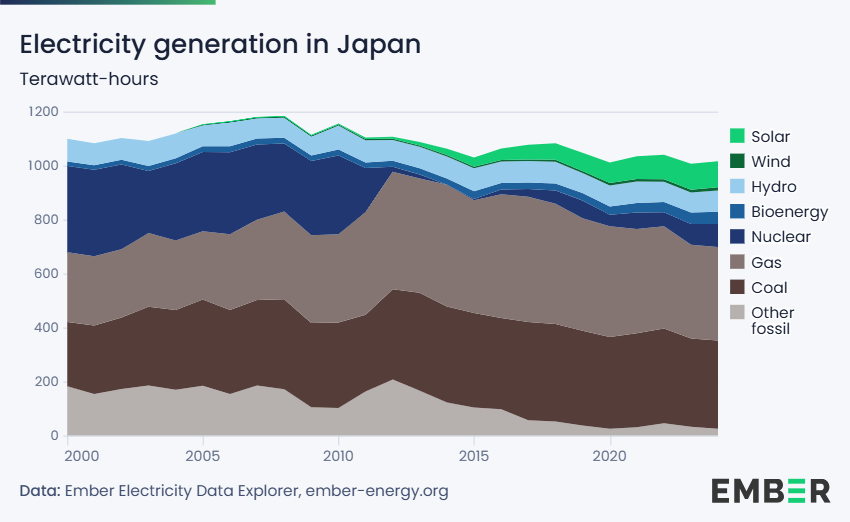
The use of nuclear power (in dark blue) in Japan declined significantly after the Fukushima accident.

=== Renewable energy ===
In September 2011, Tetsunari Iida launched the Japan Renewable Energy Foundation, which is backed by ¥1 billion (US$13 million) from Japan's richest man, Masayoshi Son. The foundation will bring together some 100 experts from around the world to analyse obstacles to implementing renewable energy, and offer policy recommendations to the new Japanese government.

As of September 2011, Japan planned to build a pilot floating wind farm, with six 2-megawatt turbines, off the Fukushima coast. Japan planned "to build as many as 80 floating wind turbines off Fukushima by 2020." A 2 MW floating wind turbine 20 km from shore began operating in 2013, with a 32% capacity factor and a floating transformer. Two larger turbines of 5 and 7 MW have been unsuccessful.

A 20 MW solar farm and a hydrogen production facility operates on the site as of 2020.

=== Coal ===
The drop in energy capacity as a result of the partial shutdown of nuclear power plants has prompted the Shinzō Abe-led government to revisit the use of coal for energy generation, primarily through the increased adoption of high energy, low emissions (HELE) power plants that employ coal pollution mitigation techniques. By 2015, the share of coal in Japan's power sector had risen to 31% from 23% prior to the Fukushima disaster, but is projected by the government to fall to 26% by 2030 as Japan's energy mix stabilizes.

== See also ==
- Anti-nuclear movement
- Anti-nuclear protests
- Fukushima disaster cleanup
- International reactions to the Fukushima Daiichi nuclear disaster
- Nuclear energy policy
- Nuclear power debate
- Nuclear renaissance
- Radiation effects from the Fukushima Daiichi nuclear disaster
- Radiation monitoring in Japan
- Timeline of the Fukushima Daiichi nuclear disaster
