= Iwai Island =

Island of the Inland Sea in Japan

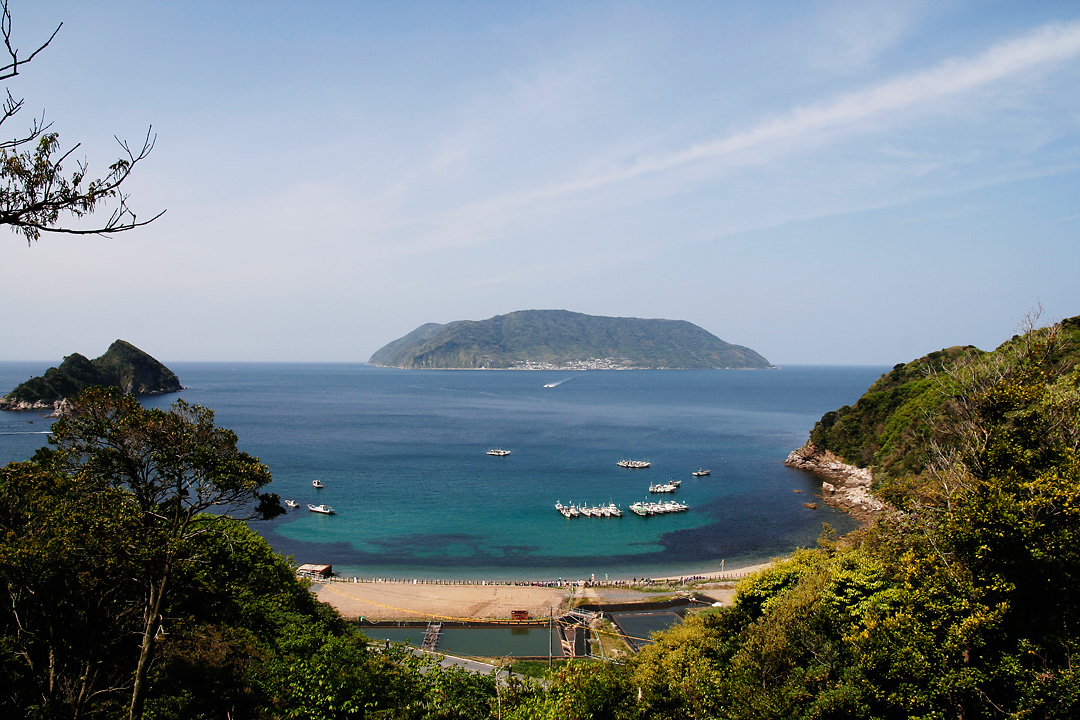
View of Nagashima-Island and Iwaishima-Island in Japan

Iwai Island (祝島, Iwai-shima) is an island of the Inland Sea in Japan. With a total altitude of 82 m, it lies at the south-eastern edge of the Yamaguchi Prefecture (山口県, Yamaguchi-ken) at coordinates 33°46′48.00″N 131°58′12.00″E.

The name is derived from the ancient ritual of passing travellers and is in fact home to a ceremonial fishing dance specific to the island as noted in the crew journey log of the Hokule‘a on their journey from Micronesia to Japan.

In 1982, Chugoku Electric Power Company proposed building a nuclear power plant near Iwaishima, but many residents opposed the idea, and the island’s fishing cooperative voted overwhelmingly against the plans. In January 1983, almost 400 islanders staged a protest march, which was the first of more than 1,000 protests the islanders carried out. Since the Fukushima nuclear disaster in March 2011 there has been wider opposition to construction plans for the plant.

== See also ==
- Ashes to Honey
- Anti-nuclear movement in Japan
