= Katsuhiko Ishibashi =

Katsuhiko Ishibashi (石橋 克彦, Ishibashi Katsuhiko; born August 8, 1944) is a professor in the Research Center for Urban Safety and Security in the Graduate School of Science at Kobe University, Japan and a seismologist who has written extensively in the areas of seismicity and seismotectonics in and around the Japanese Islands. He also coined the term genpatsu-shinsai (原発震災), from the Japanese words for "nuclear power" and "quake disaster".

Katsuhiko Ishibashi has said that Japan's history of nuclear accidents stems from an overconfidence in plant engineering. He was a member of a 2006 Japanese government subcommittee charged with revising the national guidelines on the earthquake-resistance of nuclear power plants, published in 2007. His proposal that the committee should review the standards for surveying active faults was rejected and, at the committee's final meeting he resigned claiming that the review process was "unscientific" and the outcome rigged to suit the interests of the Japan Electric Association, which had 11 of its committee members on the 19-member government subcommittee and that among other problems the guide was "seriously flawed" as a consequence because it underestimated the design basis earthquake ground motion.

In May 2011, he said: "If Japan had faced up to the dangers earlier, we could have prevented Fukushima".

== Publications ==
- Ishibashi, K., "Why worry? Japan's nuclear plants at grave risk from quake damage", International Herald Tribune and The Asia-Pacific Journal: Japan Focus (August 11, 2007)
- Ishibashi, K., "Status of historical seismology in Japan", Annals of Geophysics, Vol.47, 339-368 (2004)
- Ishibashi, K., "Seismotectonic modeling of the repeating M 7-class disastrous Odawara earthquake in the Izu collision zone, central Japan", Earth Planets Space, Vol.56, 843-858 (2004)
- Miyoshi, T. and K. Ishibashi, "Geometry of the seismic Philippine Sea slab beneath the region from Ise Bay to western Shikoku, southwest Japan, Zisin" J. Seismol. Soc. Japan, Ser. 2, Vol.57, 139-152 (English abstract) (2004) (in Japanese)
- Itani, Y. and Ishibashi, K., "Horizontal crustal strain in the Izu Peninsula - Mt. Fuji region derived from GEONET data and its tectonic implication, Zisin", J. Seismol. Soc. Japan, Ser. 2, Vol.56, 231-243 (English abstract) (2003) (in Japanese)
- Harada, T. and Ishibashi, K., "The 1958 great Etorofu earthquake was a slab event: Suggestion from the mainshock-aftershock relocation", EOS, Vol. 81, No. 22 Suppl. WP157 (2000)
- Ishibashi, K., An Era of Underground Convulsions: A Seismologist Warns, Iwanami Paperbacks, Iwanami Shoten (1994) (in Japanese)

== See also ==
- Kashiwazaki-Kariwa Nuclear Power Plant
- Pacific Ring of Fire
- Nuclear power in Japan
  - Seismicity
- Fukushima I nuclear accidents
- Kiyoo Mogi
- Geology of Japan
