= Genpatsu-shinsai =

Genpatsu-shinsai (原発震災), meaning nuclear power plant earthquake disaster (from the two words Genpatsu – nuclear power plant – and shinsai – earthquake disaster) is a term which was coined by Japanese seismologist Professor Katsuhiko Ishibashi in 1997. It describes a domino effect scenario in which a major earthquake causes a severe accident at a nuclear power plant near a major population centre, resulting in an uncontrollable release of radiation in which the radiation levels make damage control and rescue impossible, and earthquake damage severely impedes the evacuation of the population. Ishibashi envisages that such an event would have a global impact and a 'fatal' effect on Japan, seriously affecting future generations.

In Japan, Ishibashi believes that a number of nuclear power stations could be involved in such a scenario, but that the Hamaoka Nuclear Power Plant, located near the centre of the expected Tōkai earthquakes, is the most likely candidate. He is also concerned that a similar scenario could take place elsewhere in the world. As a result, he believes that the matter should be a global concern.

== See also ==
- International Nuclear Event Scale
- Nuclear power
  - Lists of nuclear disasters and radioactive incidents
  - Nuclear power debate
  - Nuclear power in Japan
    - 2011 Japanese nuclear accidents
    - Fukushima Daiichi nuclear disaster
- Seismicity in Japan
