= Jinzaburo Takagi =

- 高木 仁三郎
- Takagi in 1997
- Born: July 18, 1938; Maebashi, Gunma, Japan
- Died: October 8, 2000 (aged 62); Tokyo, Japan
- Occupation: Nuclear chemist
- Writing career
- Notable awards: Right Livelihood Award

Jinzaburo Takagi (高木 仁三郎, Takagi Jinzaburō; 18 July, 1938 – 8 October, 2000) was a Japanese assistant professor in nuclear chemistry. He wrote several books on environment protection, and on the threat of nuclear waste. He was given the Yoko Tada Human Rights Award in 1992, and the Ihatobe Award in 1994. He was awarded the Right Livelihood Award in 1997, jointly with Mycle Schneider.

He was a prolific author on the subject of nuclear technology and issues surrounding nuclear power. Just before his death in 2000, he wrote a book called "Why There Will Be Another Nuclear Disaster", which was widely read after the Fukushima Daiichi nuclear disaster in 2011.
