= 2007 Chūetsu offshore earthquake =

Earthquake in Japan

Coordinates: 37.535°N 138.446°E

- 新潟県中越沖地震
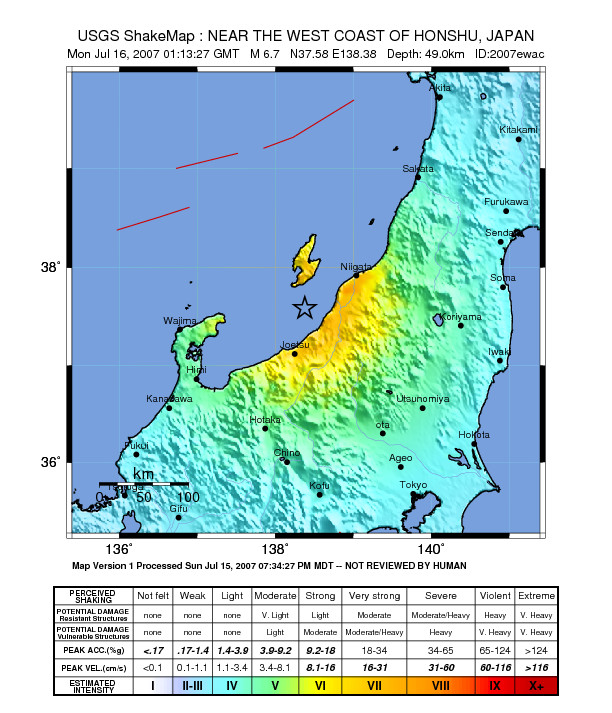

- Location within Niigata Prefecture
- UTC time: 2007-07-16 01:13:22
- ISC event: 12769769
- USGS-ANSS: ComCat
- Local date: July 16, 2007
- Local time: 10:13
- Magnitude: 6.6 M_{w}
- Depth: 10 km (6.2 mi)
- Areas affected: Japan
- Max. intensity: JMA 6+ (MMI IX)
- Peak acceleration: 1.04 g 1018.9 Gal
- Casualties: 11 dead, over 1,120 injured

A magnitude 6.6 earthquake occurred 10:13 local time (01:13 UTC) on July 16, 2007, at a previously unknown offshore fault in the northwest Niigata Prefecture of Japan. The city of Kashiwazaki and the villages of Iizuna and Kariwa registered the highest seismic intensity of a strong 6 on Japan's shindo scale, and the quake was felt as far away as Tokyo. Eleven deaths and at least 1,000 injuries were reported, and 342 buildings were completely destroyed, mostly older wooden structures. Prime Minister Shinzō Abe broke off from his election campaign to visit Kashiwazaki and promised to "make every effort towards rescue and also to restore services such as gas and electricity".

== Tectonic summary ==
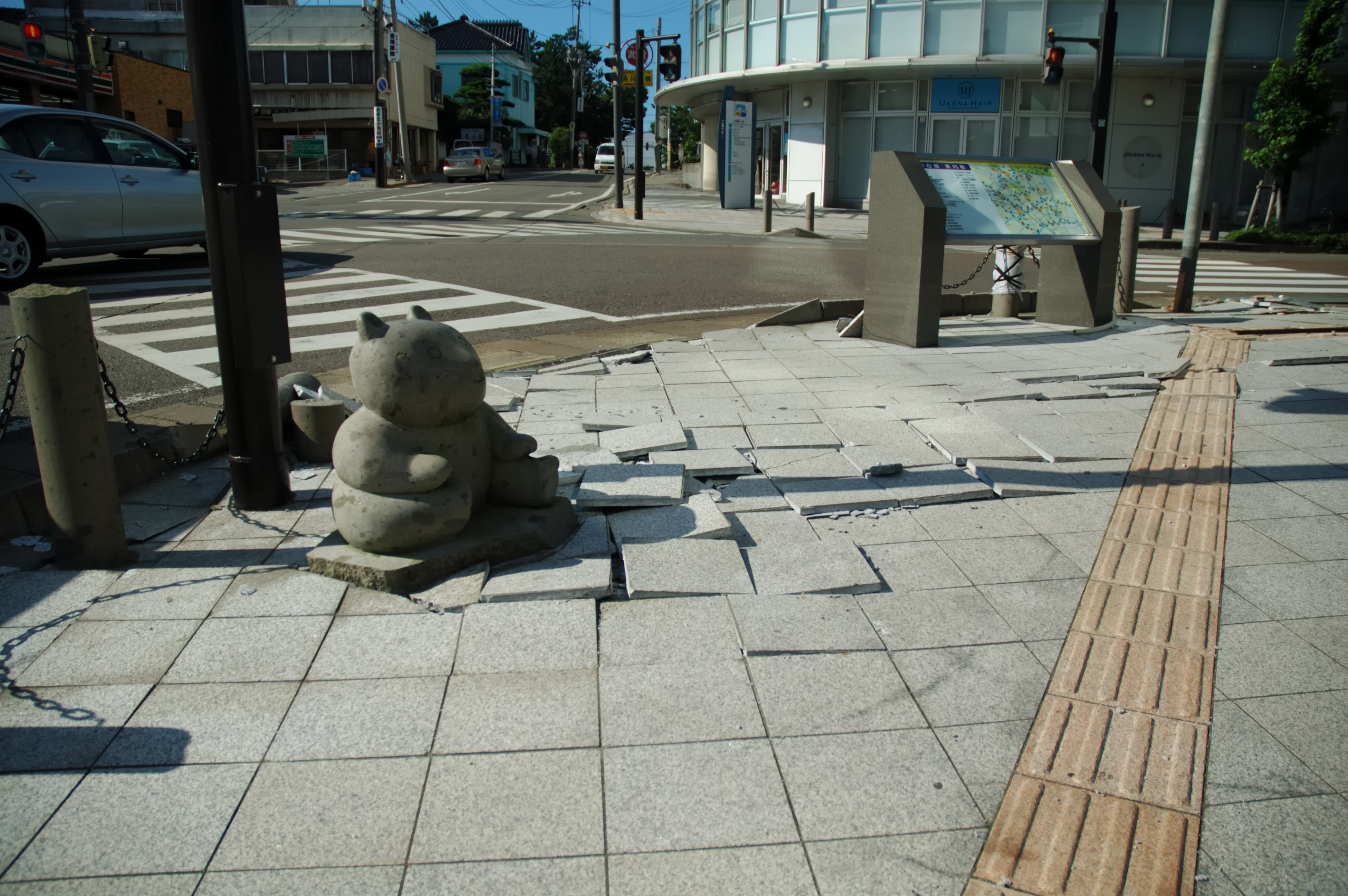
Damaged pavement tiles in Higashi-honcho, Kashiwazaki

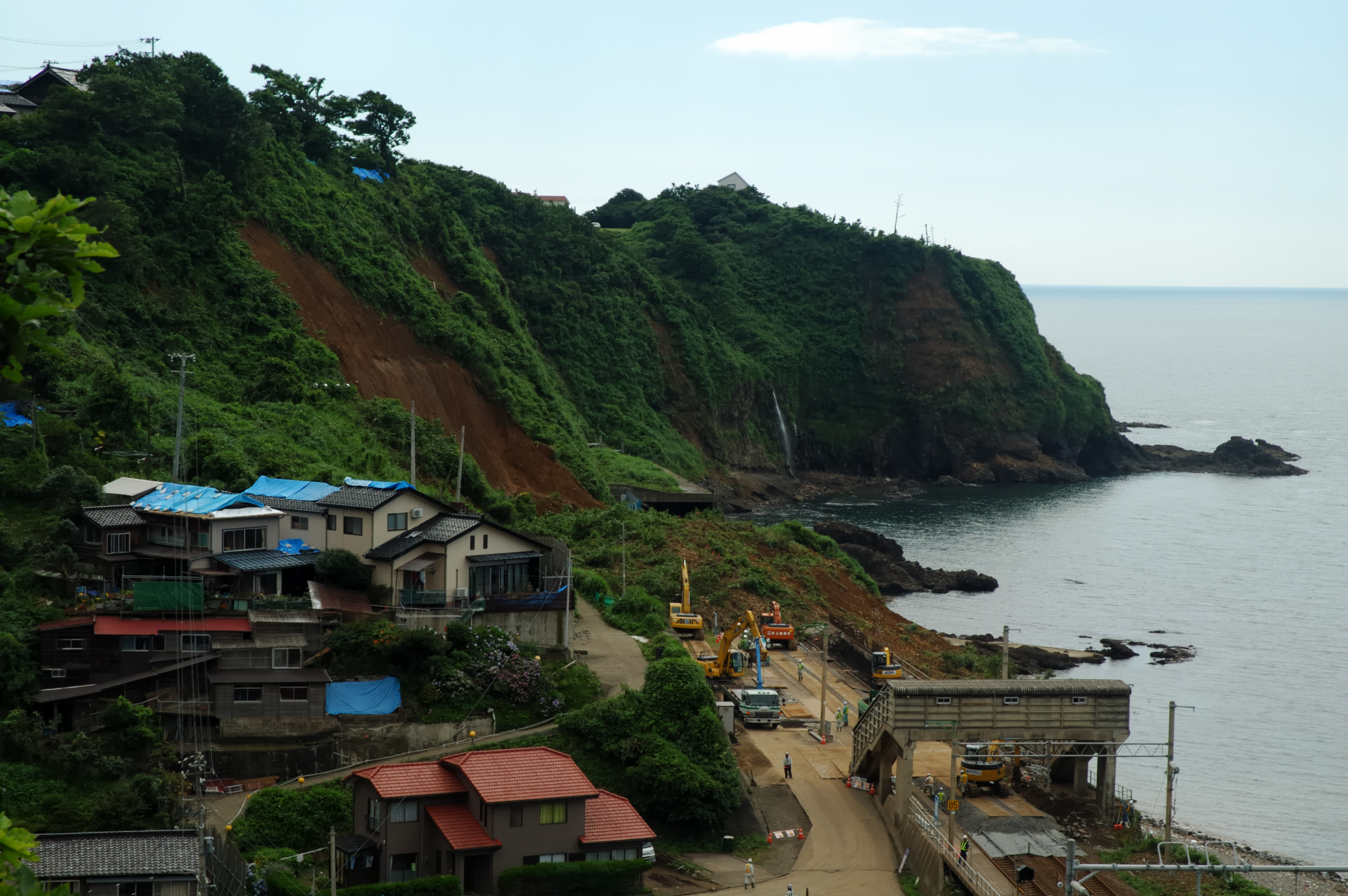
The landslide of Ōmigawa Station (July 2007)

This magnitude 6.6 earthquake occurred approximately 17 kilometres (11 mi) off the west coast of Honshū, Japan, in a zone of compressional deformation that is associated with the boundary between the Amur Plate and the Okhotsk microplate. At this latitude, the Okhotsk Plate is converging to the west-northwest towards the Amur Plate with a velocity of about 9 mm/yr and a maximum convergence rate of 24 mm/yr. The Amur and Okhotsk plates are themselves relatively small plates that lie between the Eurasian plate and the Pacific plate. The Pacific plate converges west-northwest towards the Eurasia plate at over 90 mm/yr. Most of the relative motion between the Pacific and Eurasia plates is accommodated approximately 400 km (250 mi) to the east-southeast of the epicenter of the earthquake, where the Pacific plate subducts beneath the Okhotsk Plate.

This shallow crustal earthquake was followed 13 hours later by a deep focus magnitude 6.8 quake roughly 330 km (210 mi) to the west, 350 km (220 mi) below the Sea of Japan. The two earthquakes were generated by different mechanisms. The first earthquake was caused by deformation within the crust of the Okhotsk Plate and the second quake was likely caused by faulting resulting from internal deformation of the subducted Pacific plate. Given their different mechanisms and physical separation of at least 10 rupture lengths, the second earthquake is not considered an aftershock of the first.

Shallow earthquakes cause more damage than intermediate- and deep-focus ones since the energy generated by the shallow events is released closer to the surface and therefore produces stronger shaking than is produced by quakes that are deeper within the Earth. The peak ground acceleration generated was 993 gal (1.01 g).

Two days after the initial earthquake, an aftershock, registering shindo 4, occurred in Izumozaki, Niigata.

== Intensity ==
Intensity	Prefecture	Location
6+	Niigata	Nagaoka, Kashiwazaki, Kariwa
6+	Nagano	Iizuna
6-	Niigata	Joetsu, Ojiya, Izumozaki
5+	Niigata	Sanjo, Tokamachi, Minamiuonuma, Tsubame
5+	Nagano	Nakano, Iiyama, Shinano
5-	Niigata	Kamo, Mitsuke, Kawaguchi, Uonuma, Yahiko, Niigata (Nishikan)
5-	Nagano	Nagano
5-	Ishikawa	Wajima, Suzu, Noto

== Automotive production ==
On July 18, Toyota motor announced it stopped production in all of its factories because of the damage done to the Riken parts plant in Kashiwazaki, Niigata. Nissan also had to shut down two factories. Production resumed in Toyota, Mazda, and Honda plants on July 25, after damaged equipment and gas and water supplies were restored. Toyota's production losses amounted to between 46,000 or possibly 55,000 vehicles. Nissan lost 12,000 vehicles.

== Kashiwazaki-Kariwa Nuclear Power Plant incidents ==
The earthquake caused a leak of radioactive gases from Kashiwazaki-Kariwa Nuclear Power Plant. A small amount of water from the spent fuel pool leaked out but plant operators said the leak was insignificant and did not present any environmental danger. The earthquake also caused a fire in an electrical transformer at the plant that was extinguished after two hours.

The government requested that the plant remain closed pending safety inspections. The International Atomic Energy Agency offered to send a team of experts to inspect the plant. The Japanese government initially declined the offer but later accepted it after Niigata Prefecture legislature asked for confidence building efforts to counter public concern about the reactor. Following the incident, Kiyoo Mogi, chair of Japan's Coordinating Committee for Earthquake Prediction, called for the immediate closure of the Hamaoka Nuclear Power Plant, which was built close to the centre of the expected Tōkai earthquake.

== See also ==
- List of earthquakes in 2007
- List of earthquakes in Japan
