= Kwan-ichi Terazawa =

Japanese mathematician and administrator

Kwanichi Terazawa
- Born: July 15, 1882; Yonezawa, Japan
- Died: February 5, 1969 (aged 86)
- Citizenship: Japan
- Education: Imperial University of Tokyo
- Awards: Grand Cordon of the Order of the Rising Sun (1965)
- Scientific career
- Fields: Mathematics
- Workplaces: Imperial University of Tokyo
- Doctoral advisor: Joseph Larmor
- Doctoral students: Takahiko Yamanouchi; Masao Kotani; Tosio Kato; Isao Imai

Kwanichi Terazawa (寺沢 寛一, Terazawa Kan'ichi; July 15, 1882 – February 5, 1969) was a Japanese mathematician and administrator.

Terazawa was born in Yonezawa, graduated from the Imperial University of Tokyo in 1908 following the study of physics, and earned his D.Sc. degree in 1917. His career at the Imperial University of Tokyo lasted from 1918 to his retirement in 1949 where he was professor of physics, while having served as professor at the Aeronautical Research Institute for nineteen of those years. He served as the director of that institution in 1942–1943 and as professor at the Earthquake Research Institute from 1936 to 1942 (and as director in 1938–1942). For the period 1938-1943 he was employed as dean of the Faculty of Science and in 1951 he was received at the Japan Academy.

== Publications ==
- Introduction to Mathematics for Natural Scientists (in Japanese). Iwanami-shoten 1928, 1954.
- Introduction to Mathematics for Natural Scientists II (in Japanese). Iwanami-shoten 1960.
