= Hironari =

- Gender: Male

Origin
- Origin: Japanese
- Meaning: Different meanings depending on the kanji used

Hironari (written: 洋成, 弘成, 弘就 or 弘也) is a masculine Japanese given name. Notable people with the name include:

- Hineno Hironari (日根野 弘就; 1518–1602), Japanese samurai and daimyō
- Hironari Iwamoto (岩元 洋成; born 1970), Japanese footballer
- Hironari Miyazawa (宮沢 弘成; born 1927), Japanese particle and nuclear physicist
- Hironari Yamazaki (山崎 弘也; born 1976), Japanese comedian
