= Hamaoka Nuclear Power Plant =

Nuclear power plant in Omaezaki, Shizuoka Prefecture, Japan

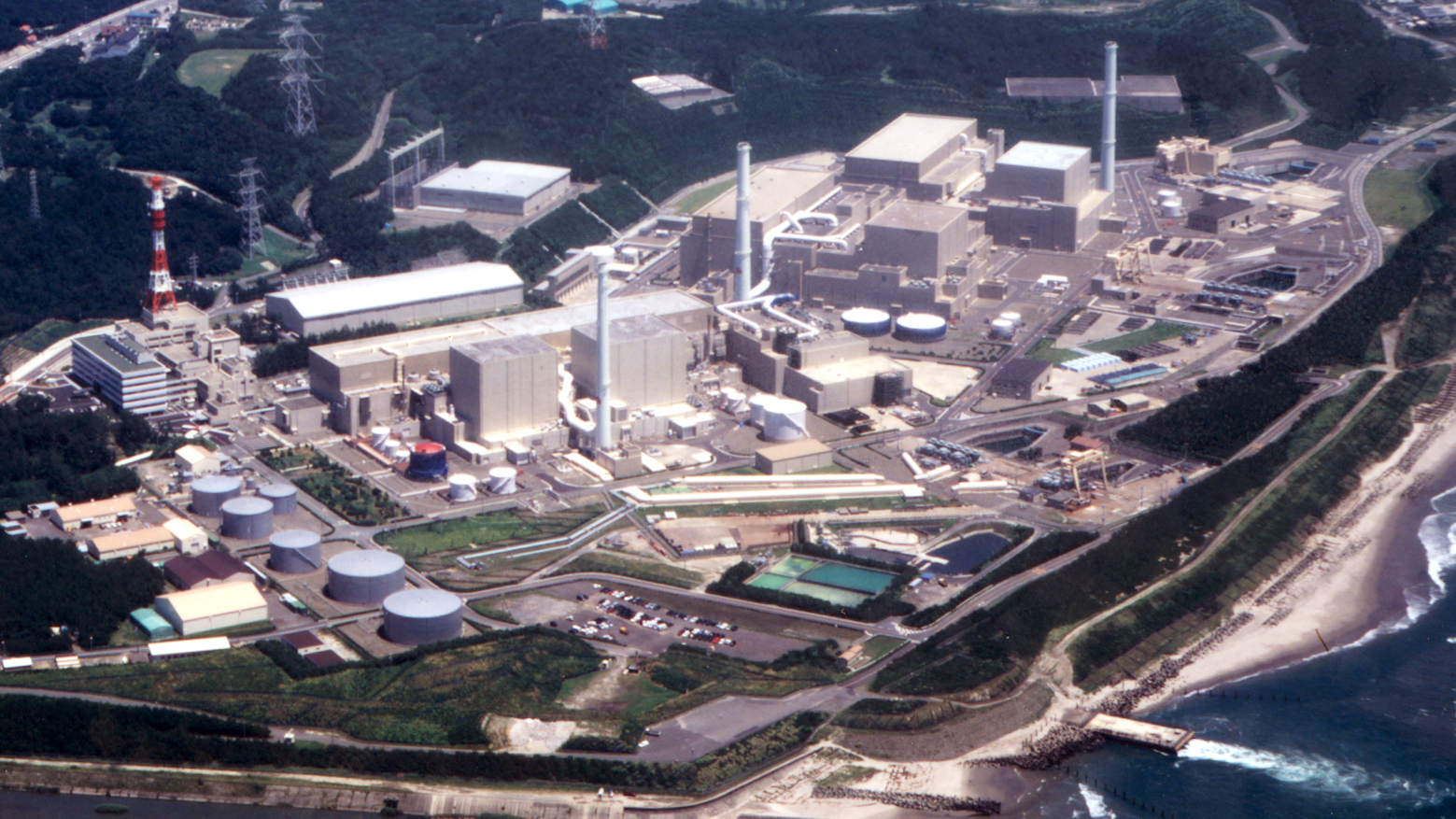
- Hamaoka NPP aerial photo
- Country: Japan
- Coordinates: 34.6211°N 138.1454°E
- Status: Out of service for 15 years, 5 months
- Construction began: June 10, 1971
- Commission date: March 17, 1976
- Operator: Chubu Electric Power Company
- Cooling source: Enshū-nada Sea

Power generation
- Units operational: 1 × 1100 MW; 1 × 1137 MW; 1 × 1267 MW
- Units decommissioned: 1 × 540 MW; 1 × 840 MW
- Nameplate capacity: 3504 MW
- Capacity factor: 0%
- Annual net output: 0 GW·h

External links
- Website: www.chuden.co.jp/energy/nuclear/hamaoka/
- Commons: Related media on Commons

The Hamaoka Nuclear Power Plant (浜岡原子力発電所, Hamaoka Genshiryoku Hatsudensho; Hamaoka NPP) is a nuclear power plant in the city of Omaezaki in Shizuoka Prefecture, on Japan's east coast, 200 km south-west of Tokyo. It is managed by the Chubu Electric Power Company. There are five units contained at a single site with a net area of 1.6 km^{2} (395 acres). The two oldest units were permanently shut down in 2009 and are currently being decommissioned. Three units Hamaoka-3, 4 and 5 are in long-term shutdown since the aftermath of the Fukushima accident in 2011. From 2011 to 2017 these units underwent significant safety upgrades to enhance their resistance against extreme environmental impacts such as earthquakes and tsunamis. In 2014, Chubu Electric submitted an application to resume power generation, but the review by the Nuclear Regulation Authority has been progressing slowly, and is still ongoing as of 2026. A sixth unit was proposed in 2008 but its construction has been deferred indefinitely.

The Hamaoka Nuclear Exhibition Center, a free public exhibition on nuclear power, is situated next to the plant.

== History ==
=== Construction ===
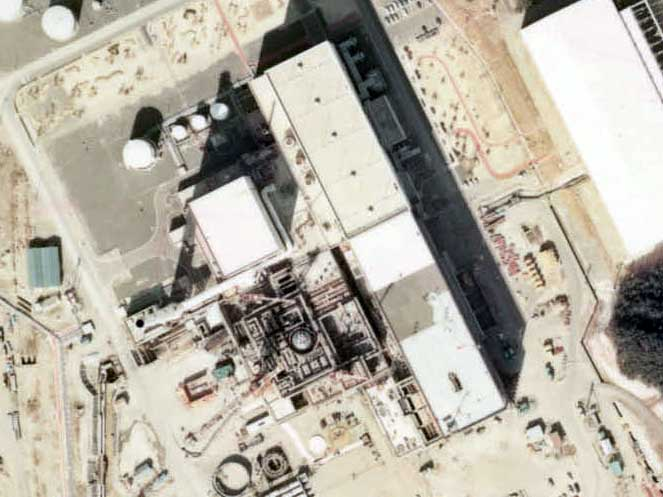
A view of construction of Unit 2 from the air (1975). Unit 1 is in operation to the side of it. Copyright National Land Image Information (Color Aerial Photograph), Ministry of Land, Infrastructure and Transport.

Construction of the first unit, Hamaoka-1, commenced on June 10th 1971. The reactor reached its first criticality three years later and went into commercial operation in 1976. The second unit began construction in 1974 and successfully went into commercial operation in 1978. The first two units were built in close proximity and share some of their infrastructure. Both reactors are BWR-4 boiling water reactors from General Electric. The plant had originally been designed to withstand an earthquake of magnitude 8.5. Sand hills of up to 15 m height have provided defence against a tsunami of up to 8 m high until 2012, when Hamaoka was equipped with a concrete sea barrier.

A second set of reactors, unit 3 and 4 were subsequently built on the plant site with the more powerful BWR-5 design of over 1 GW net capacity per unit. Unit 3 was constructed from April 18, 1983 and commenced commercial operation in 1987. Construction of unit 4 began on October 13, 1989 and commercial operation started in 1993.

The fifth unit, Hamaoka-5, with the even more advanced ABWR-design and a net capacity of 1.325 GW was constructed from 2000 on as a single unit. The reactor reached its first criticality on March 23, 2004 and went into commercial operation in 2005.

Hamaoka is built directly over the subduction zone near the junction of two tectonic plates, and a major Tōkai earthquake was said in 2004 to be overdue. The possibility of such a shallow magnitude 8.0 earthquake in the Tokai region was picked out by Kiyoo Mogi in 1969, 7 months before permission to construct the Hamaoka plant was sought, and by the Coordinating Committee for Earthquake Prediction (CCEP) in 1970, prior to the permission being granted on December 10, 1970. As a consequence, Professor Katsuhiko Ishibashi, a former member of a government panel on nuclear reactor safety, claimed in 2004 that Hamaoka was 'considered to be the most dangerous nuclear power plant in Japan' with the potential to create a genpatsu-shinsai (domino-effect nuclear power plant earthquake disaster).

=== Operation ===
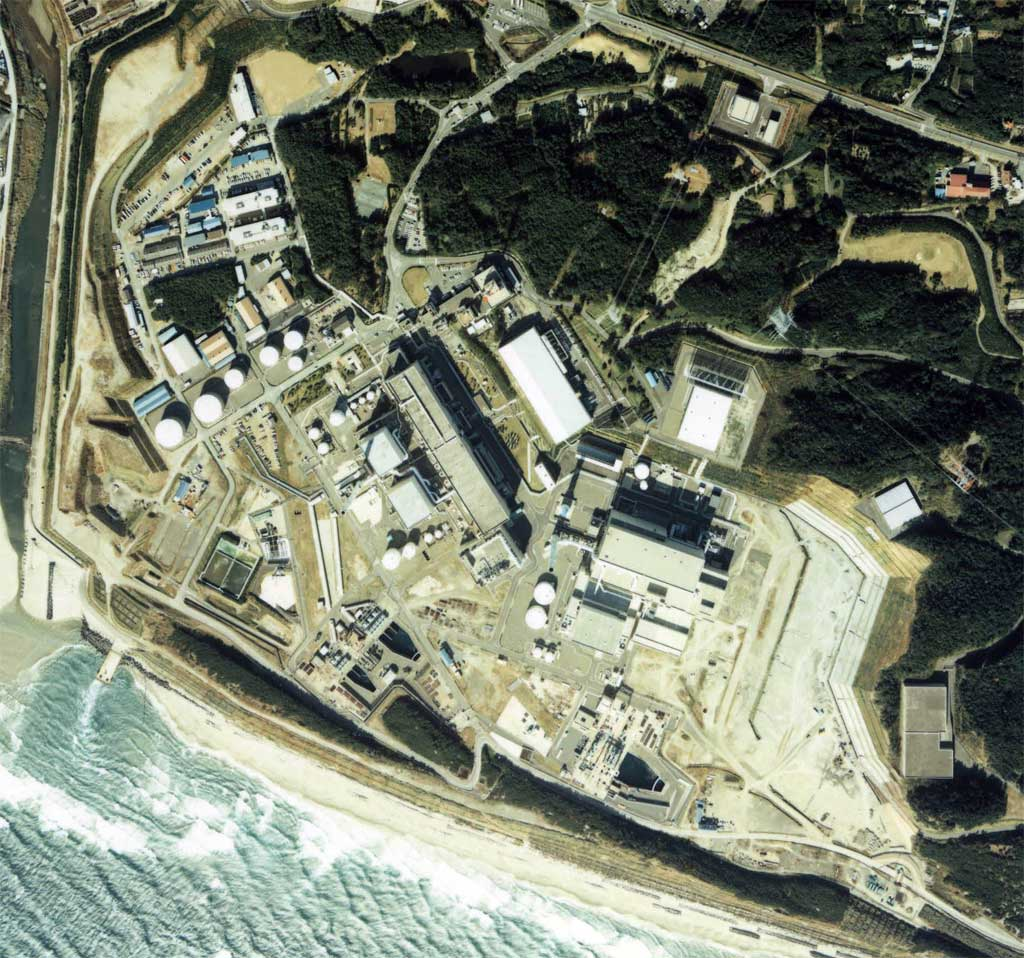
Image taken from the air (1988). In this image, all units through Hamaoka-3 are operating. Copyright National Land Image Information (Color Aerial Photograph), Ministry of Land, Infrastructure and Transport.

The plant showed stellar performance through the 1990s, however, problems that caused unit 1 to be shut down from 2001 on, and unit 2 from 2005 on significantly hurt the capacity factor figures of the plant. Both reactors were initially shut down in 2001 and 2004, respectively, for safety-related upgrades.

The 2007 Chūetsu offshore earthquake, although far away from Hamaoka, raised concerns about the impact on such an event on the plant, and Kiyō Mogi, by then chair of Japan's Coordinating Committee for Earthquake Prediction, called for the immediate closure of the plant. After the earthquake, units 1 and 2 were considered too vulnerable and would have required expensive safety upgrades to meet new seismic standards to continue operation. So it was decided in December 2008 to decommission both units and replace them with a more modern and robust sixth unit on the eastern side of the plant. The decommissioning started in 2009 with the first of four stages. In a second stage from 2016 to 2022, equipment surrounding the reactors was dismantled, and the decommissioning is expected to complete in 2036. Units 3, 4 and 5 continued regular operation.

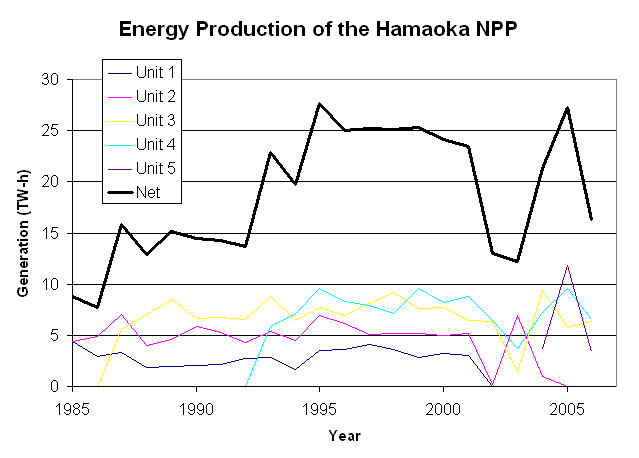

=== Shutdown ===
In the aftermath of the Fukushima nuclear accident all nuclear reactors in Japan were shut down within two years to allow a reassessment of the safety measures concerning massive earthquakes and tsunamis. At Hamaoka, the likelihood of an earthquake of magnitude 8.0 or higher to hit the area within the following 30 years was estimated at 87%. Thus, Prime Minister Naoto Kan requested on May 6, 2011 the plant be shut down to avoid a possible repeat of the Fukushima accident. Unit 3, which had been undergoing regular inspections since October 2010, was not to restart until further notice. Kan said that considering the unique location of the Hamaoka plant, the operator must draw up and implement mid-to-long-term plans to ensure the reactors can withstand the projected Tōkai earthquake and any triggered tsunami. Kan also said that until such plans are implemented, all the reactors should remain out of operation. The Yomiuri Shimbun, one of Japan's largest newspapers, criticized Kan and his request, calling it "abrupt" and noting the difficulty towards Chubu Electric's shareholders and further stated Kan "should seriously reflect on the way he made his request". Yomiuri followed up with an article that wondered how dangerous Hamaoka really was and claimed the request was "a political judgment that went beyond technological worthiness".

Chubu Electric announced three days after the president's request to comply with it. Units 4 and 5 were shut down on May 13 and May 14, 2011, respectively. In July 2011, a mayor in Shizuoka Prefecture and a group of residents filed a lawsuit seeking the decommissioning of the reactors at the Hamaoka nuclear power plant permanently, without success.

=== Safety upgrades ===
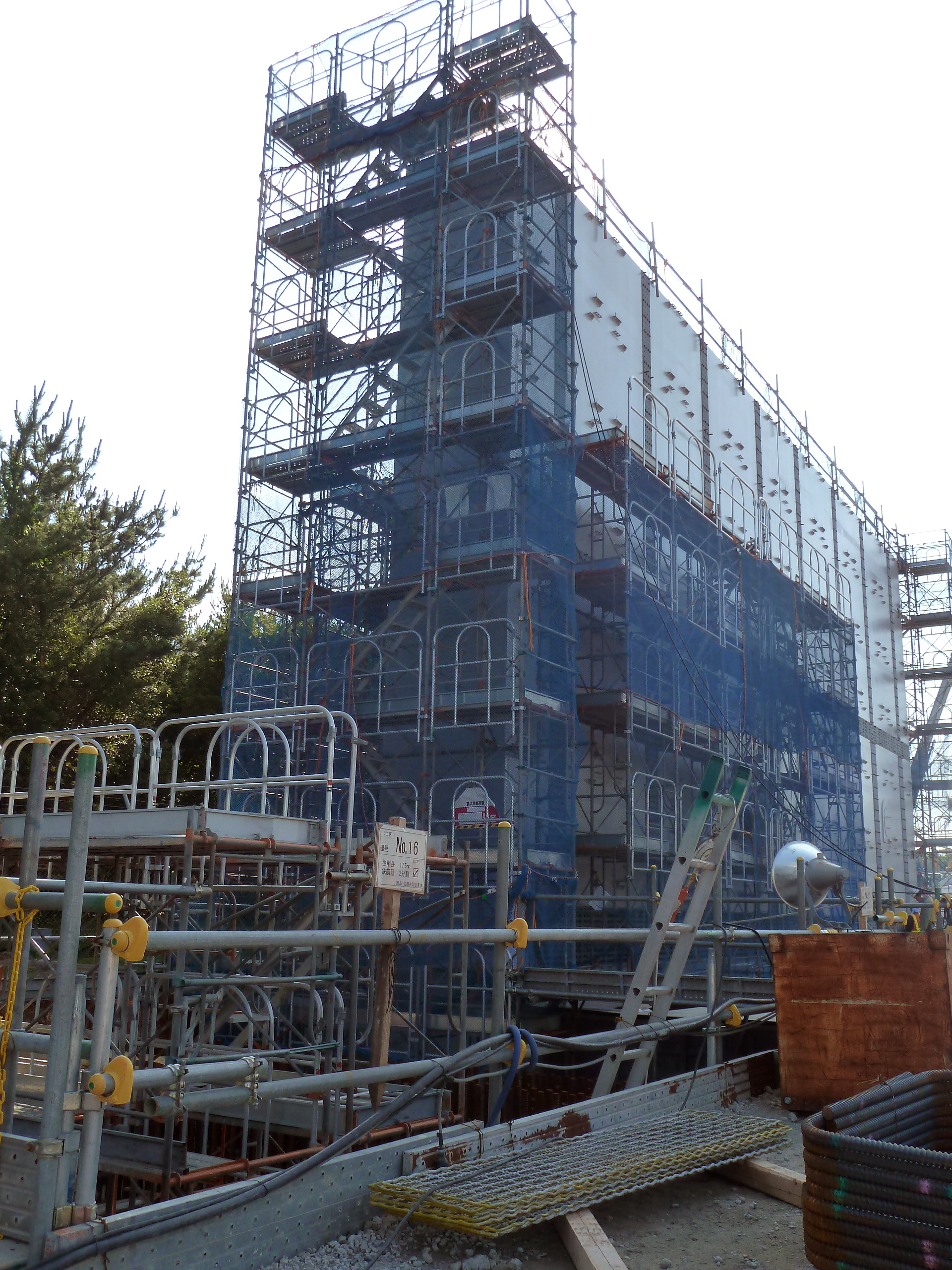
Construction of a breakwater wall in 2012

Until 2011, the plant was protected from tsunamis by a row of sand dunes with 10-15m above sea level, compared to 10m tsunamis that were to strike after a magnitude 9 earthquake. In response to increased safety requirements after Fukushima, Chubu announced in July 2011 measures the increase the plant's protection against tsunamis and flooding. A first set of measures to prevent flooding was implemented until the end of 2012. This included construction of a breakwater wall to first 18 and finally 22 meters above sea level, waterproofing of seawater pumps and the installation of water pumps in building basements. Existing diesel generator rooms were waterproofed, and spare generators with long term fuel supply were installed on a hill 25m above sea level. Connections to the power grid were doubled. All this would protect the reactors against waves higher than the waves that occurred in the Fukushima accident. The barrier would also be 10 meters taller than the highest waves expected in the area in the event of 3 major earthquakes occurring at the same time.

In March 2012, new earthquake modelling studies became available, which requested additional revisions, that extended the reinforcement work to the end of 2013. In particular, additional gas turbine generators were installed on high ground for emergency electric supply of cooling equipment.

In June 2013 the Nuclear Regulation Authority (NRA) announced revised safety regulations concerning natural phenomena as well as mitigation of potential accidents, which must be fulfilled by the plant in order to restart. These regulations required additional upgrades to the plant, including protection against fire, tsunamis and flood. Ground and supports for pipes and cables had to be reinforced for earthquake resistance, outdoor equipment was secured against object impacts during tornadoes. The full implementation of these measures took four more years until 2017.

=== Restart ===
In Omaezaki city, restarting or decommissioning the Hamaoka nuclear power plant became a big issue in campaigning for the 15 April 2012 mayoral election. Of three candidates, the sitting mayor Shigeo Ishihara was willing to grant a restart, after consultation with the city residents and taking into account the "lessons learned form the Fukushima crisis", if he were re-elected for a third term. Haruhisa Muramatsu, a travel agent and member of the Japanese communist party, said that the plant should be decommissioned, and the third candidate Katsuhisa Mizuno, a former city councilor, promised that the power plant would not be taken into service, if he should win the election. The pro-restart candidate Ishihara was re-elected. In 2013 mayors in the vicinity of the plant were divided in half about a possible restart.

The first safety review by the NRA for a restart of unit 4 was sought in February 2014, and for unit 3 in June 2015. The review, however, was delayed by investigations into a possible geological fault under the plant. Chubu had launched its own surveys and reported no active fault line near the plant.

In the following years, residents in the plant's neighbourhood increasingly supported a restart of the plant. In 2022 the fraction of opponents of the plant's restart was down to 32 percent, while 36 percent then supported the restart. The Kishida administration, which governed Japan between 2021 and 2024 has expressed its devotion to bring as many nuclear reactors back to the grid as possible.

At the beginning of 2024 the NRA review of Hamaoka was ongoing, without a clearly foreseeable timeline. Chubu is committed to reopening the plant for energy production.

On 17 March 2025, the dismantling of the plant's Number 2 Reactor began, in what is the first operation of its kind in Japan.

In January 2026, the Nuclear Regulation Authority announced it had found that the plant's operator had fabricated data about earthquake risks, and suspended its safety evaluation of a potential plant restart. A whistleblower had reported that the operator had for many years provided fabricated data about potential seismic risks, which was confirmed by an investigation.

On 25 September 2026, Chubu Electric withdrew its applications to restart Hamaoka Units 3 and 4 following the seismic-data falsification scandal. On 29 October, the company announced that it had recorded ¥370.3 billion in extraordinary losses related to its nuclear power business, comprising fixed-asset impairments and nuclear-fuel valuation losses.

== Reactor data ==
Unit	Reactor Type	Net Capacity	Gross Capacity	Construction Start	Grid Connection	Commercial Operation	Status
Hamaoka-1	BWR-4	515 MW	540 MW	June 10, 1971	August 13, 1974	March 17, 1976	Permanent shutdown January 30, 2009; Decommissioning
Hamaoka-2	BWR-4	806 MW	840 MW	June 14, 1974	May 4, 1978	November 29, 1978	Permanent shutdown January 30, 2009; Decommissioning
Hamaoka-3	BWR-5	1056 MW	1100 MW	April 18, 1983	January 20, 1987	August 28, 1987	Shutdown; November 29, 2010; Operable, seeking permission
Hamaoka-4	BWR-5	1092 MW	1137 MW	October 13, 1989	January 27, 1993	September 3, 1993	Shutdown; May 13, 2011; Operable, seeking permission
Hamaoka-5	ABWR	1212 MW	1267 MW	July 12, 2000	April 26, 2004	January 18, 2005	Shutdown; May 14, 2011; Operable, seeking permission

== Incidents ==
Hamaoka Nuclear Plant has never suffered from an accident or incident according to the INES scale since the beginning of its operation in 1976. The following events below INES-0 safety relevance have occurred:

- 1991, April 4 – Unit 3 reactor coolant supply lowered, automatic SCRAM
- 2001, November 7 – A valve in the HPCI system of Unit 1 ruptured during a Periodical-manual-startup-test. Since this is considered a part of the ECCS, the implications reach further than the event itself, and drew into question the reliability of the emergency safety system. Unit 2 was also shut down for the purpose of investigating similar structures.
- 2001, November 9 – Unit 1 coolant leak accident
- 2002 – In an independent inspection, it was discovered that 16 unique signs of cracks in steam pipes were known by the utility but failed to report to the prefecture level authorities.
- 2002, May 24 – Unit 2 water leak
- 2004, February 21 – Unit 2 outbreak of fire in room above turbine room
- 2004, August – Unit 4 problem with fabrication of data by utility
- 2005, November 4 – Unit 1 pipe leak incident
- 2005, November 16 – Unit 3 outside pipe leak due to corrosion
- 2005, November 16 – Unit 1 spent fuel pool had foreign matter detected in it.
- 2006, June 15 –
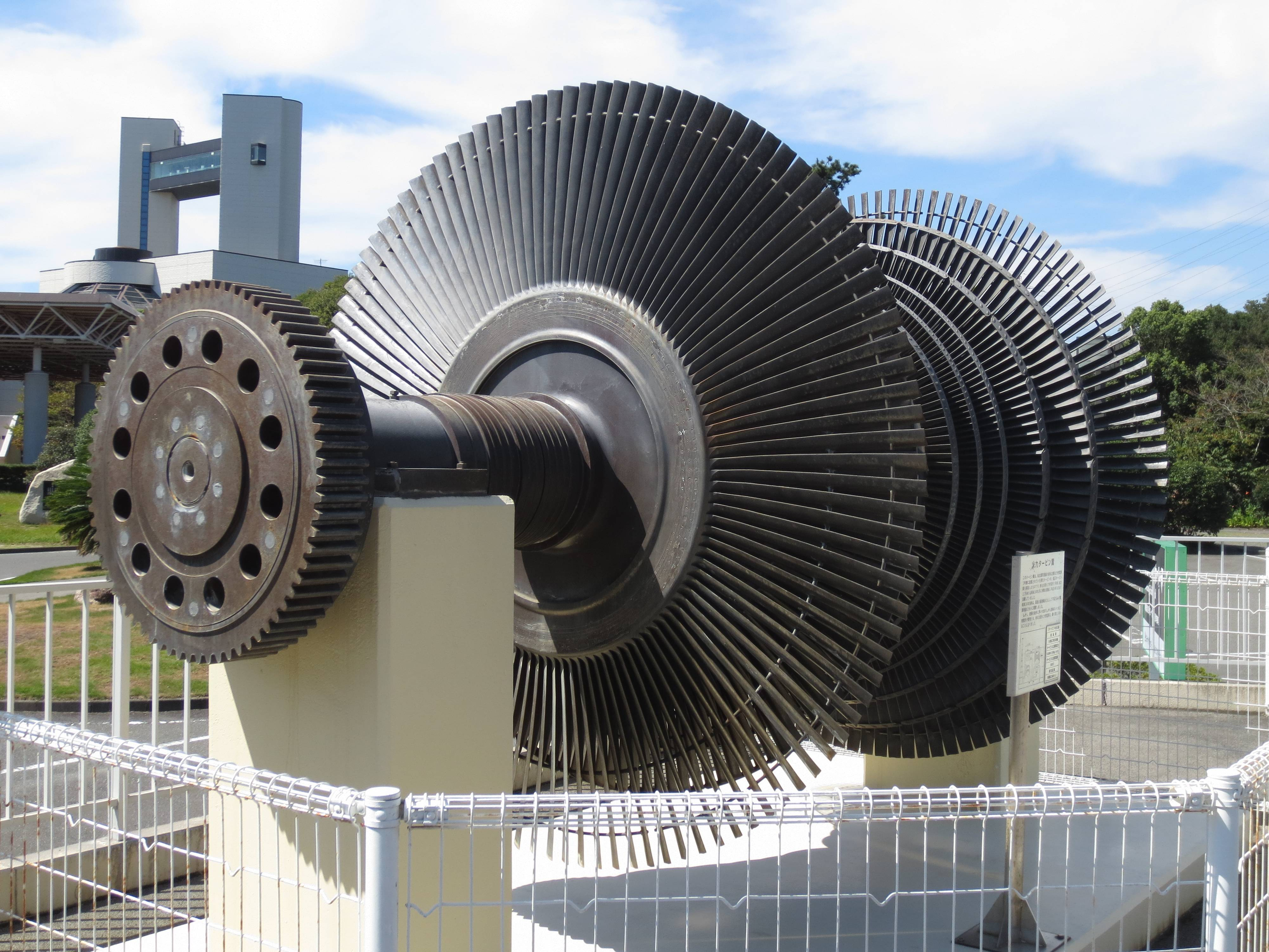
  Turbine rotor at the Hamaoka Nuclear Exhibition Center
  Unit 5 was shut down due to excessive turbine vibrations. It was discovered that a number of turbine vanes had actually completely broken off. In the turbine that failed, nearly all vanes showed fractures or cracking while the majority of the vanes of the other two low pressure turbines also showed problems. Fault for the problems was placed on Hitachi, the Nuclear Steam Supply System manufacturer, who agreed to cover the entire costs of repairing the turbine.
- 2007, March – Utility admitted to 14 cases of unfair business practices.
- 2009, August 11 – The two operating units 4 and 5 automatically shut down due to an earthquake.
- 2009, December 1 – Leakage of radioactive water. 23 workers were exposed to 0.05 mSv in additional radiation (around 0.9 times the weekly dose of an average person).
- 2011, May 15 – 400 tons of seawater were found to have leaked into the Unit 5 turbine steam condenser.
- 2011, May 20 – Damaged pipes were located in the Unit 5 condenser, and the operator estimated that about five tons of seawater may have entered the reactor itself.

== See also ==
- List of nuclear power plants in Japan
- Nuclear power in Japan#Seismicity
