= Janzen–Rayleigh expansion =

In fluid dynamics, Janzen–Rayleigh expansion represents a regular perturbation expansion using the relevant mach number as the small parameter of expansion for the velocity field that possess slight compressibility effects. The expansion was first studied by O. Janzen in 1913 and Lord Rayleigh in 1916.

== Steady potential flow ==
Consider a steady potential flow that is characterized by the velocity potential $\varphi(\mathbf x).$ Then $\varphi$ satisfies

$$(c^2-\varphi_x^2)\varphi_{xx}+(c^2-\varphi_y^2)\varphi_{yy}+(c^2-\varphi_z^2)\varphi_{zz}-2(\varphi_x\varphi_y\varphi_{xy}+\varphi_y\varphi_z\varphi_{yz}+\varphi_z\varphi_x\phi_{zx})=0$$

where $c=c(v^2)$, the sound speed is expressed as a function of the velocity magnitude $v^2=(\nabla \varphi)^2.$ For a polytropic gas, we can write

$$c^2 = c_0^2 - \frac{\gamma-1}{2}v^2$$

where $\gamma$ is the specific heat ratio, $c_0^2 = h_0(\gamma-1)/2$ is the stagnation sound speed (i.e., the sound speed in a gas at rest) and $h_0$ is the stagnation enthalpy. Let $U$ be the characteristic velocity scale and $c_0$ is the characteristic value of the sound speed, then the function $c(v^2)$ is of the form

$$\frac{c^2}{U^2} = \frac{1}{M^2} - \frac{\gamma-1}{2}\frac{v^2}{U^2}.$$

where $M=U/c_0$ is the relevant Mach number.

For small Mach numbers, we can introduce the series

$$\varphi = U (\varphi_0 + M^2 \varphi_1 + M^4 \varphi_2 + \cdots)$$

Substituting this governing equation and collecting terms of different orders of $Ma$ leads to a set of equations. These are

$$\begin{align}
\nabla^2\varphi_0 &= 0,\\
\nabla^2\varphi_1 & = \varphi_{0,x}^2\varphi_{0,xx} + \varphi_{0,y}^2\varphi_{0,yy} + \varphi_{0,z}^2\varphi_{0,zz} +2(\varphi_{0,x}\varphi_{0,y}\varphi_{0,xy}+\varphi_{0,y}\varphi_{0,z}\varphi_{0,yz}+\varphi_{0,z}\varphi_{0,x}\phi_{0,zx}),
\end{align}$$

and so on. Note that $\varphi_1$ is independent of $\gamma$ with which the latter quantity appears in the problem for $\varphi_2$.

=== Imai–Lamla method ===
A simple method for finding the particular integral for $\varphi_1$ in two dimensions was devised by Isao Imai and Ernst Lamla. In two dimensions, the problem can be handled using complex analysis by introducing the complex potential $f(z,\overline z) = \varphi + i\psi$ formally regarded as the function of $z=x+iy$ and its conjugate $\overline z = x-iy$; here $\psi$ is the stream function, defined such that

$$u =\frac{\rho_\infty}{\rho}\frac{\partial\psi}{\partial y}=\frac{\partial\varphi}{\partial x}, \quad v =-\frac{\rho_\infty}{\rho}\frac{\partial\psi}{\partial x}=\frac{\partial\varphi}{\partial y}$$

where $\rho_\infty$ is some reference value for the density. The perturbation series of $f$ is given by

$$f(z,\overline z) = U[f_0(z) + M^2 f_1(z,\overline z) + \cdots]$$

where $f_0=f_0(z)$ is an analytic function since $\varphi_0$ and $\psi_0$, being solutions of the Laplace equation, are harmonic functions. The integral for the first-order problem leads to the Imai–Lamla formula

$$f_1(z,\overline z) = \frac{1}{4} \frac{df_0}{dz}\overline{\int\left(\frac{df_0}{dz}\right)^2dz} + F(z)$$

where $F(z)$ is the homogeneous solution (an analytic function), that can be used to satisfy necessary boundary conditions. The series for the complex velocity potential $g = u-iv$ is given by

$$g(z,\overline z) = U[g_0(z) + M^2g_1(z,\overline z) +\cdots]$$

where $g_0=df_0/dz$ and

$$g_1(z,\overline z) = \frac{1}{4} \frac{d^2f_0}{dz^2}\overline{\int\left(\frac{df_0}{dz}\right)^2dz} + \frac{1}{4}\overline{ \frac{df_0}{dz}}\left(\frac{df_0}{dz}\right)^2 + \frac{dF}{dz}.$$
