= Tōkai region =

Subregion of Chūbu and Kansai, Japan

- Subregion
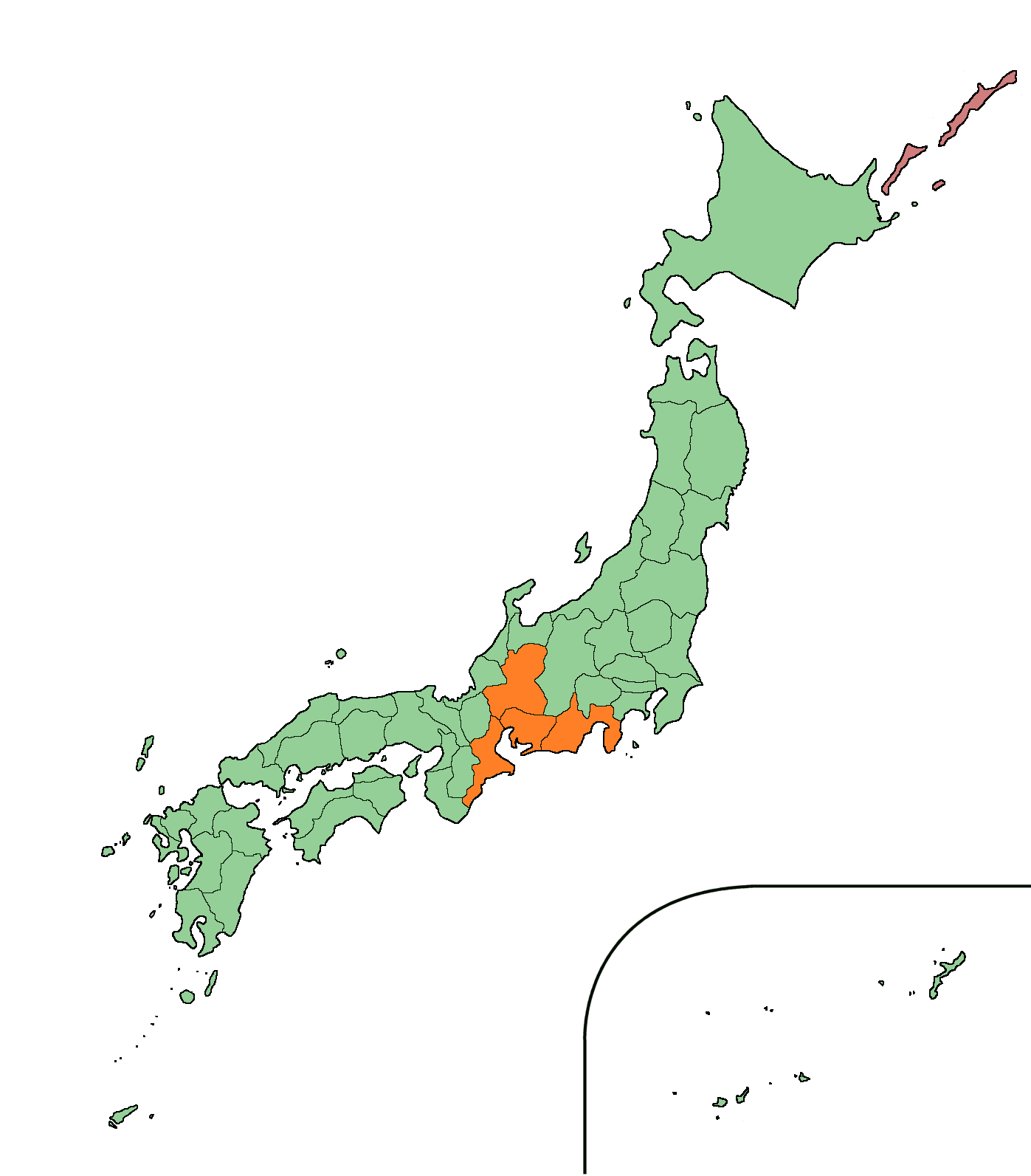
- Map of Japan with the Tōkai region highlighted
- Country: Japan
- Region: Chūbu, Kansai
- Largest city: Nagoya
- Prefectures: Shizuoka, Aichi, Gifu, Mie

Area
  - Total: 29,316.53 km^{2} (11,319.18 sq mi)

Population (March 1, 2010)
  - Total: 15,138,397
  - Density: 516.3775/km^{2} (1,337.412/sq mi)

The Tōkai region (東海地方, Tōkai-chihō) is a subregion of the Chūbu region and Kansai region in Japan that runs along the Pacific Ocean. The name comes from the Tōkaidō, one of the Edo Five Routes. Because Tōkai is a sub-region and is not officially classified, there is some disagreement about where exactly the region begins and ends, however Japanese maps widely conclude that the region includes Shizuoka, Aichi, Gifu and Mie prefectures.

The largest major city in the region is Nagoya and the Chūkyō Metropolitan Area (Nagoya Metropolitan Area) makes up a large portion of the region and has Japan's third strongest economy. The business influence of this urban area sometimes extends out into the outlying areas of the three prefectures centered on Nagoya which are Aichi, Gifu, and Mie; this area is sometimes referred to as the Chūkyō region.

Tōkai is a heavy manufacturing area and is one of the most industrial regions in Japan. Its coast is lined with densely populated cities with economies that thrive on factories.

== Geology ==
The Tōkai region has experienced a number of large earthquakes in the past, including the two great earthquakes in 1944 (also known as the "Tonankai earthquake") and 1945 (also known as the "Mikawa earthquake"). Following the work of Kiyoo Mogi, it is predicted that there is a possibility that the area will be subject to a shallow magnitude 8.0 earthquake in the near future. Nagoya, Shizuoka, and other large cities would be greatly damaged, with potential casualties in the tens of thousands. The Coordinating Committee for Earthquake Prediction designated the region as an Area of Specific Observation in 1970, and upgraded it to an Area of Intensified Observation in 1974.

== Railroads ==
Central Japan Railway Company, an arm of the former national railway Japan Railways Group, operates in an area roughly coextensive with the Tōkai region. In fact, JR Central's official Japanese name is Tōkai Railway Company, abbreviated to JR-Tōkai ("JR Central" is the English name). JR Central operates the Tōkaidō Main Line between Atami and Maibara stations, as well as the Tōkaidō Shinkansen high speed line between Tokyo and Shin-Ōsaka, and many conventional lines joining with the Tōkaidō Main Line.

== Economy ==
Economy of Tōkai subregion is largely based on the Chūkyō metropolitan area that lies within its borders. Note that the Chūkyō metropolitan area is also known as Greater Nagoya as the largest and most influential city of the metropolitan area is Nagoya. Automobile giants Toyota and Suzuki are located in Tōkai subregion. Yamaha corporation is also located in Tōkai subregion.

== Demographics ==
Per Japanese census data, and, Tōkai subregion much like Chūkyō metropolitan area has experienced continuous population growth throughout the 20th century.

Since around 2010 though, the Tōkai subregion has experienced population decline, decreasing by around 1% between the censuses for 2010 and 2020.

Historical population
Year	Pop.	±%
1920	5,779,000	—
1930	6,700,000	+15.9%
1940	7,649,000	+14.2%
1950	8,868,000	+15.9%
1960	10,085,000	+13.7%
1970	11,778,000	+16.8%
1980	13,316,000	+13.1%
1990	14,222,000	+6.8%
2000	14,775,732	+3.9%
2010	15,138,397	+2.5%
2020	14,985,454	−1.0%

== Major cities ==
Designated city

- Hamamatsu City: (designated city)
- Nagoya City: (designated city, the capital of Aichi Prefecture)
- Shizuoka City: (designated city, the capital of Shizuoka Prefecture)

Core city

- Gifu City: (core city, the capital of Gifu Prefecture)

Special city

- Yokkaichi City: (special city)

Other major cities

- Tsu City: (the capital of Mie Prefecture)
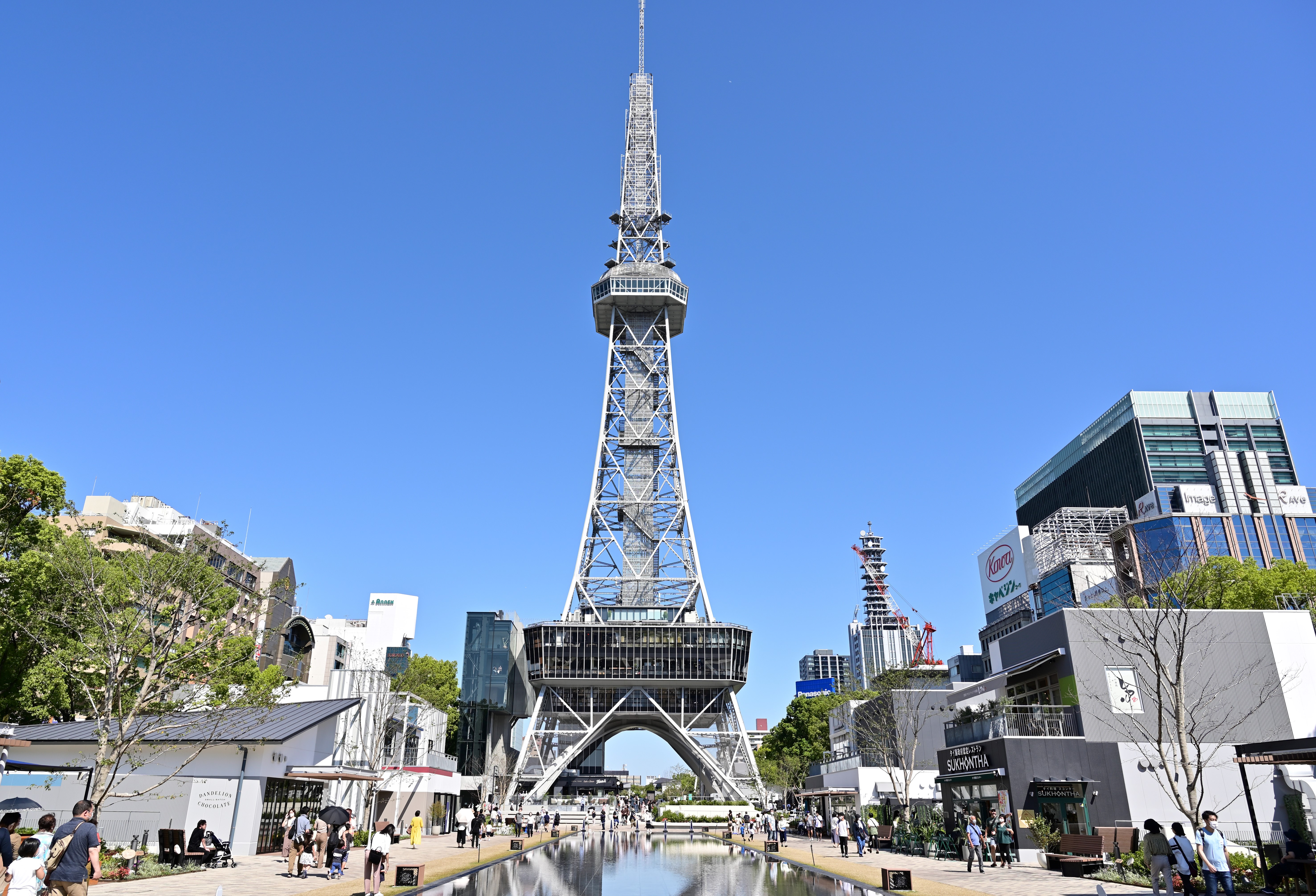
Nagoya City

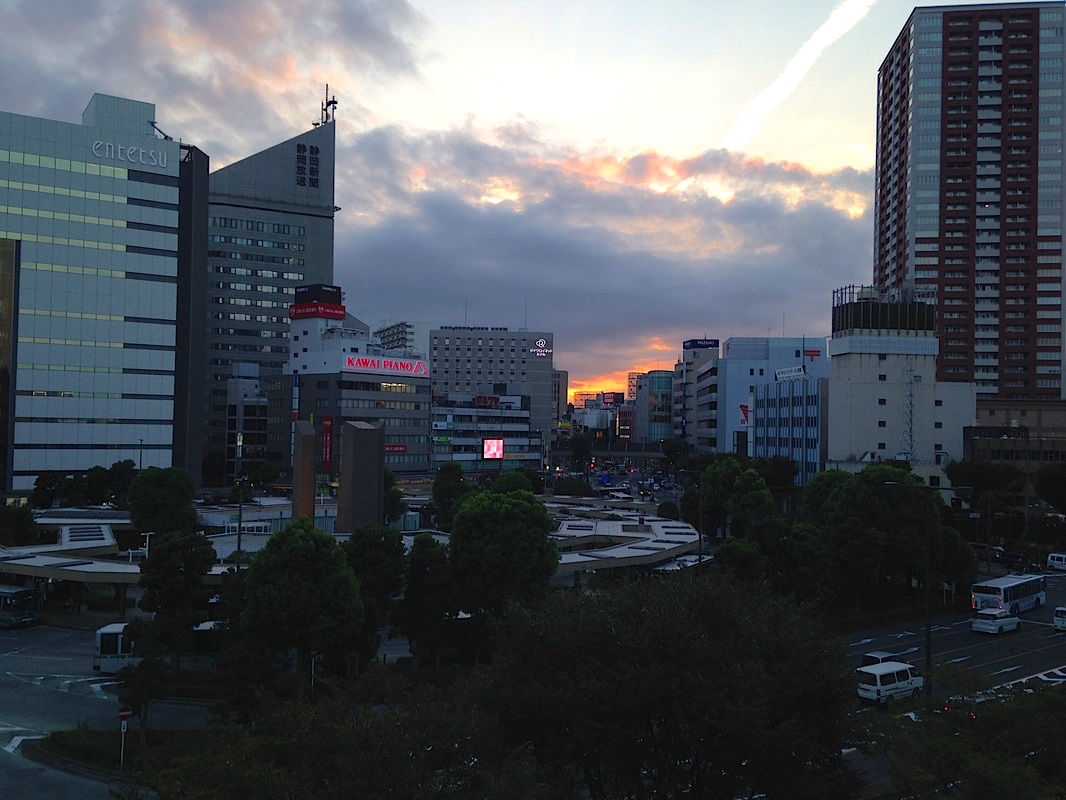
Hamamatsu City

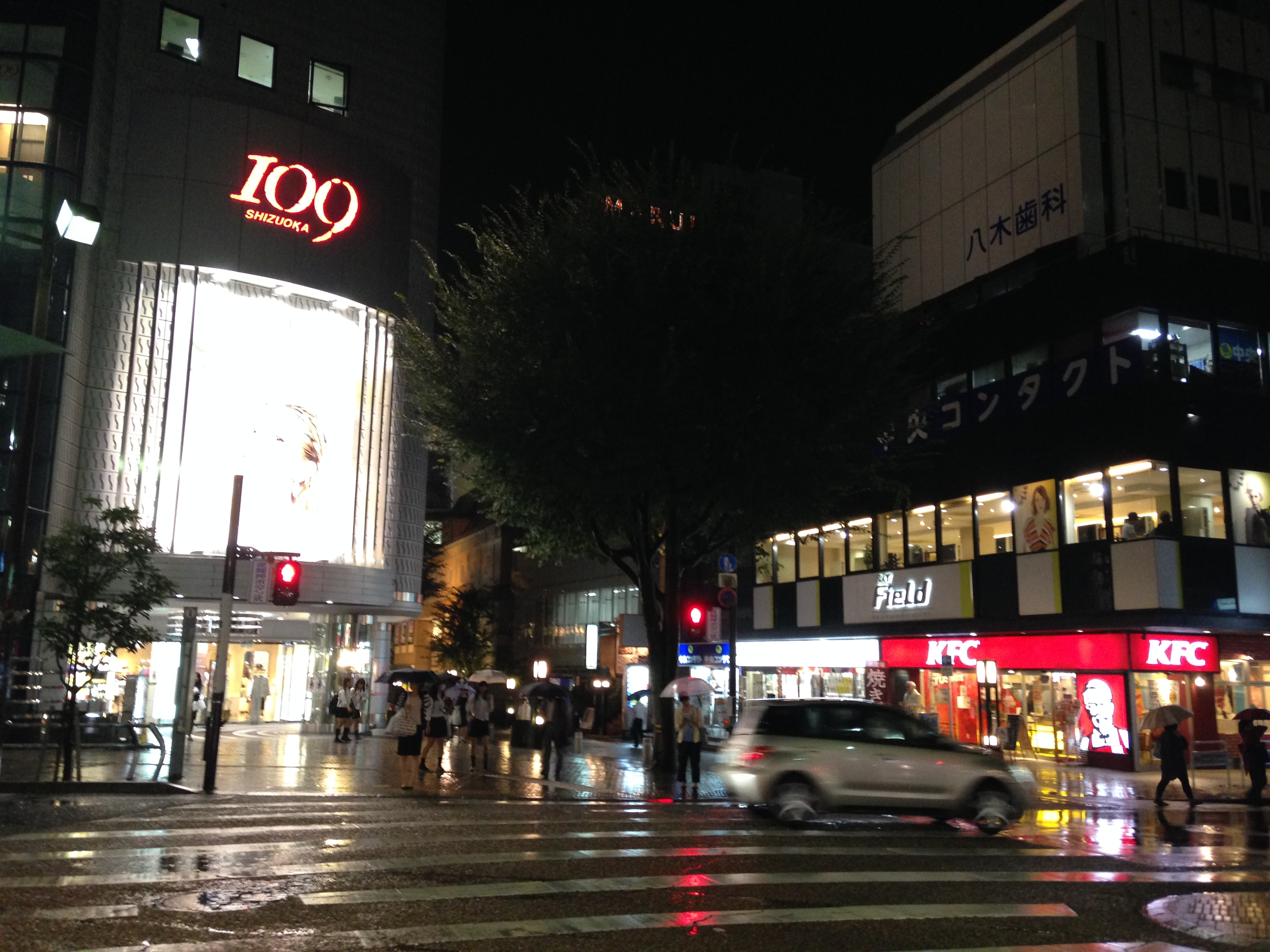
Shizuoka City

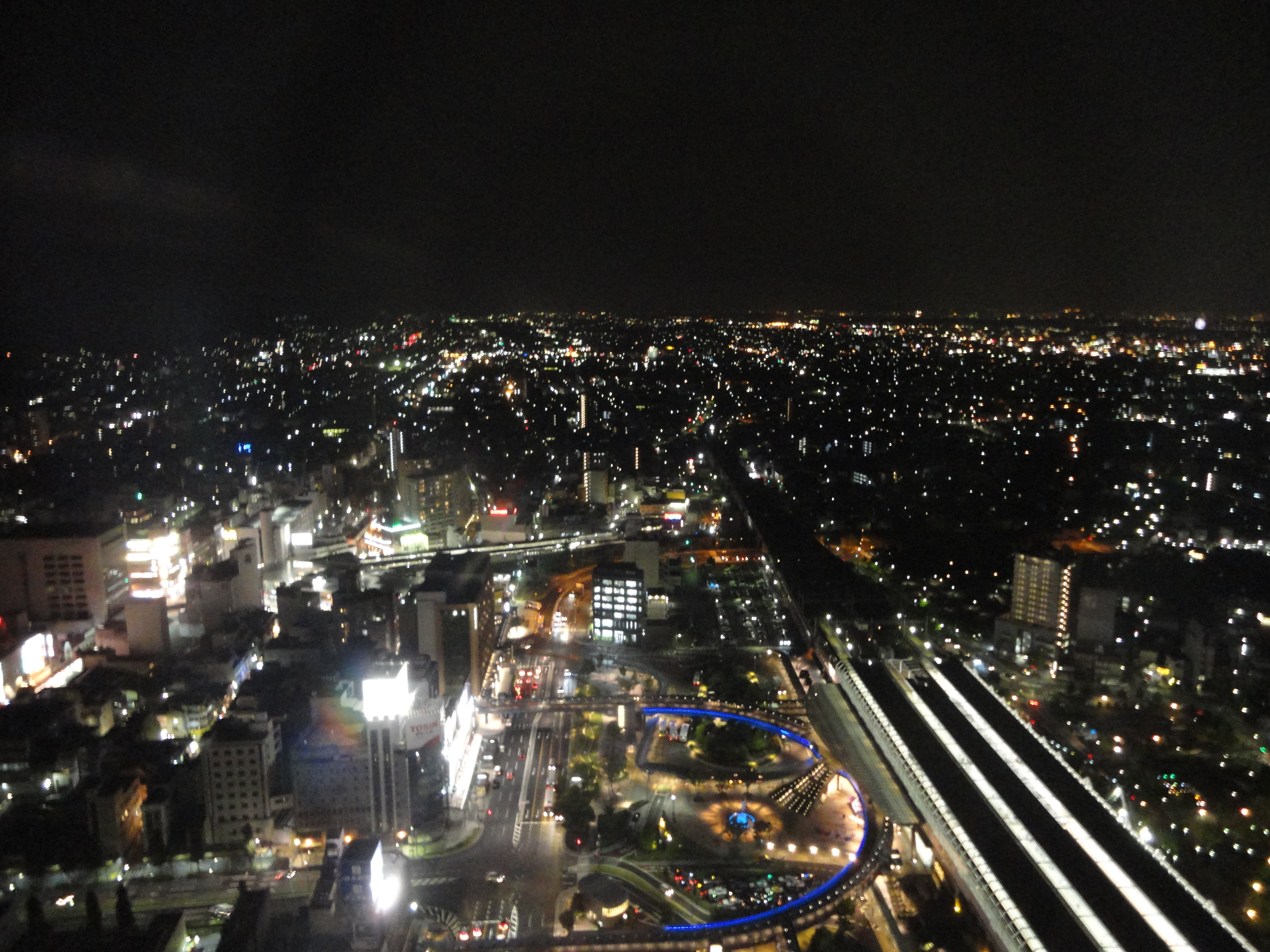
Gifu City

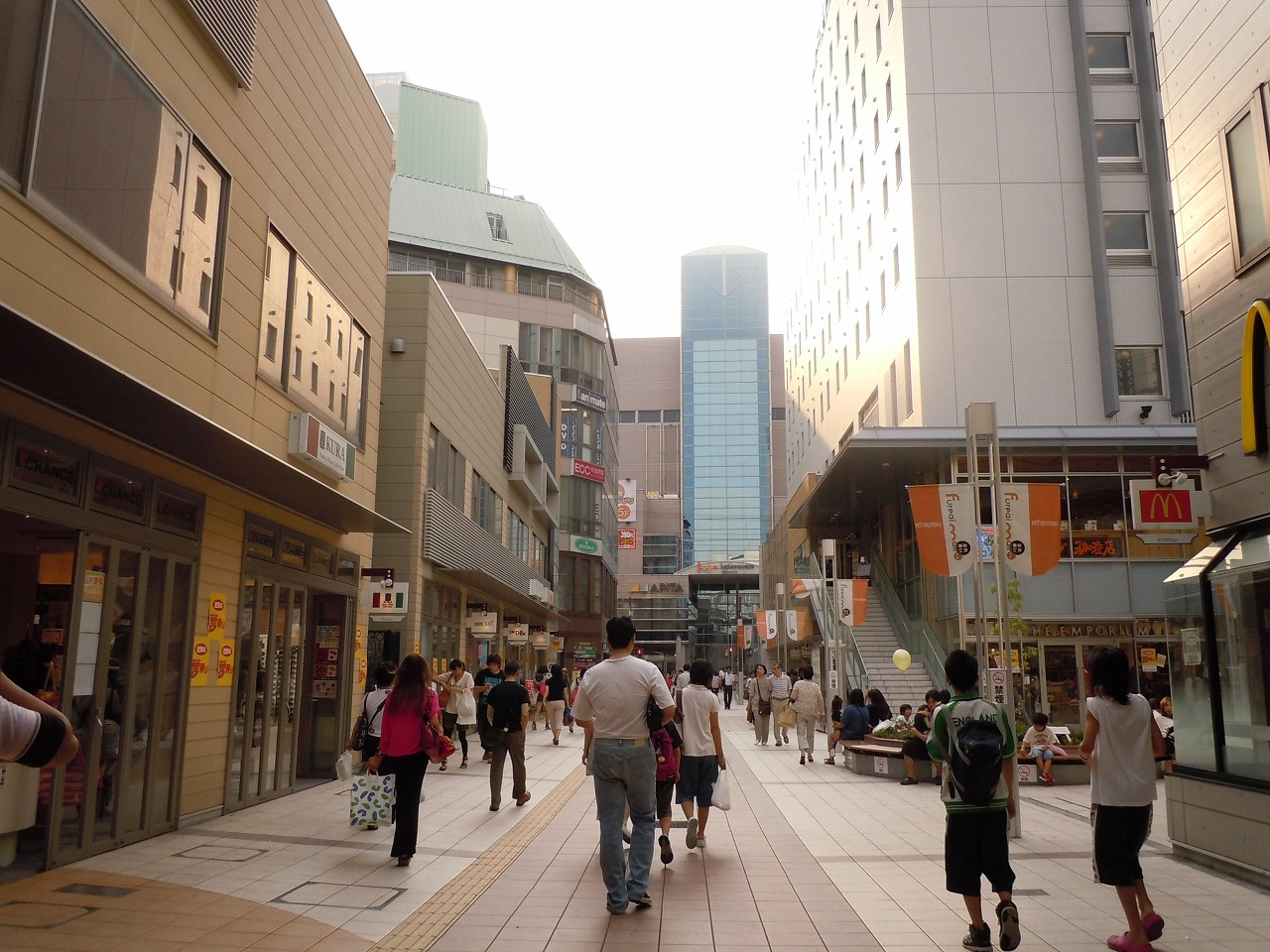
Yokkaichi City

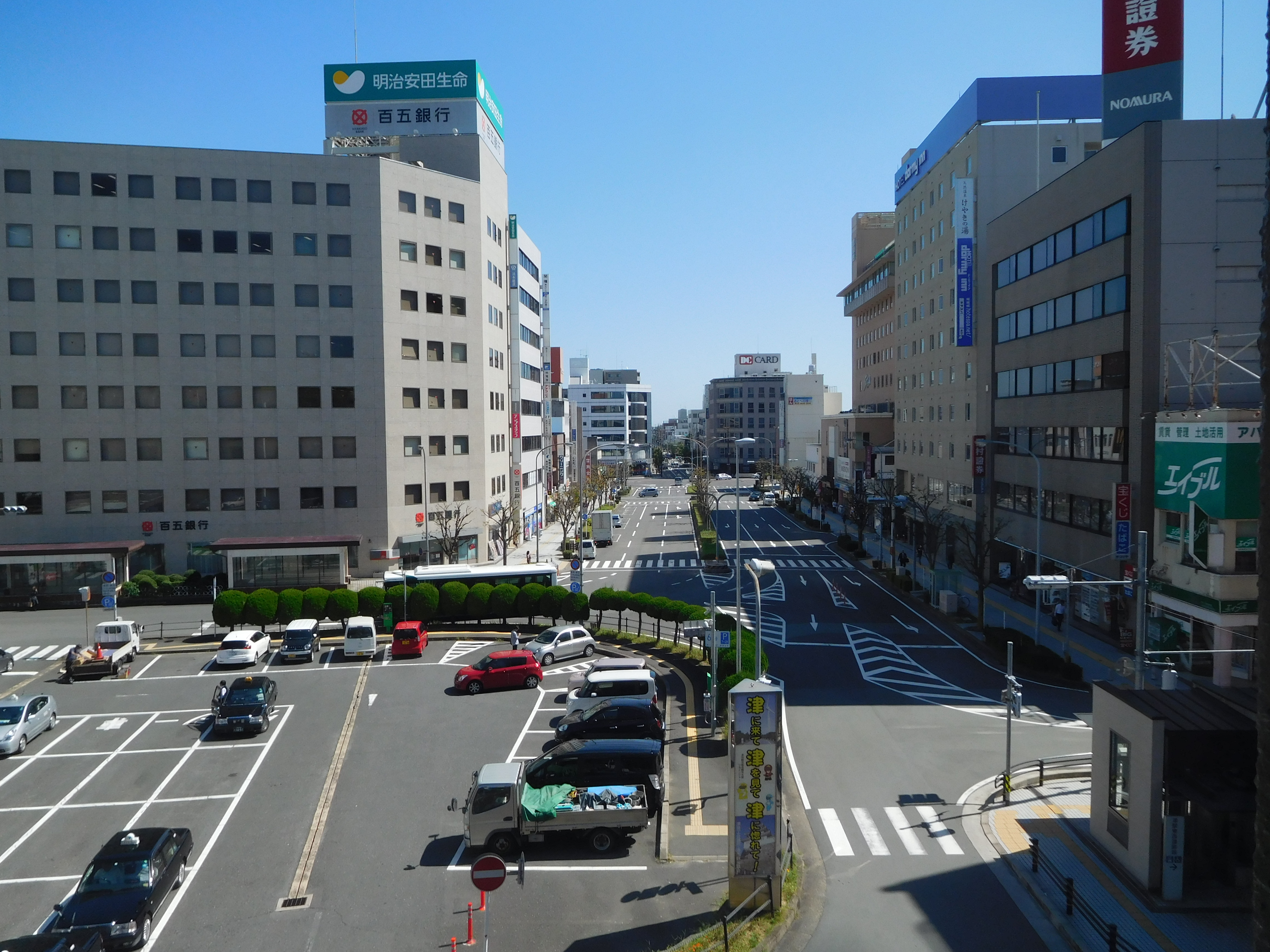
Tsu City

=== Other cities ===
- Toyota City: a core city
- Okazaki City: a core city
- Toyohashi City: a core city
- Ichinomiya City: a special city
- Kasugai City: a special city
- Fuji City: a special city
- Numazu City: a special city
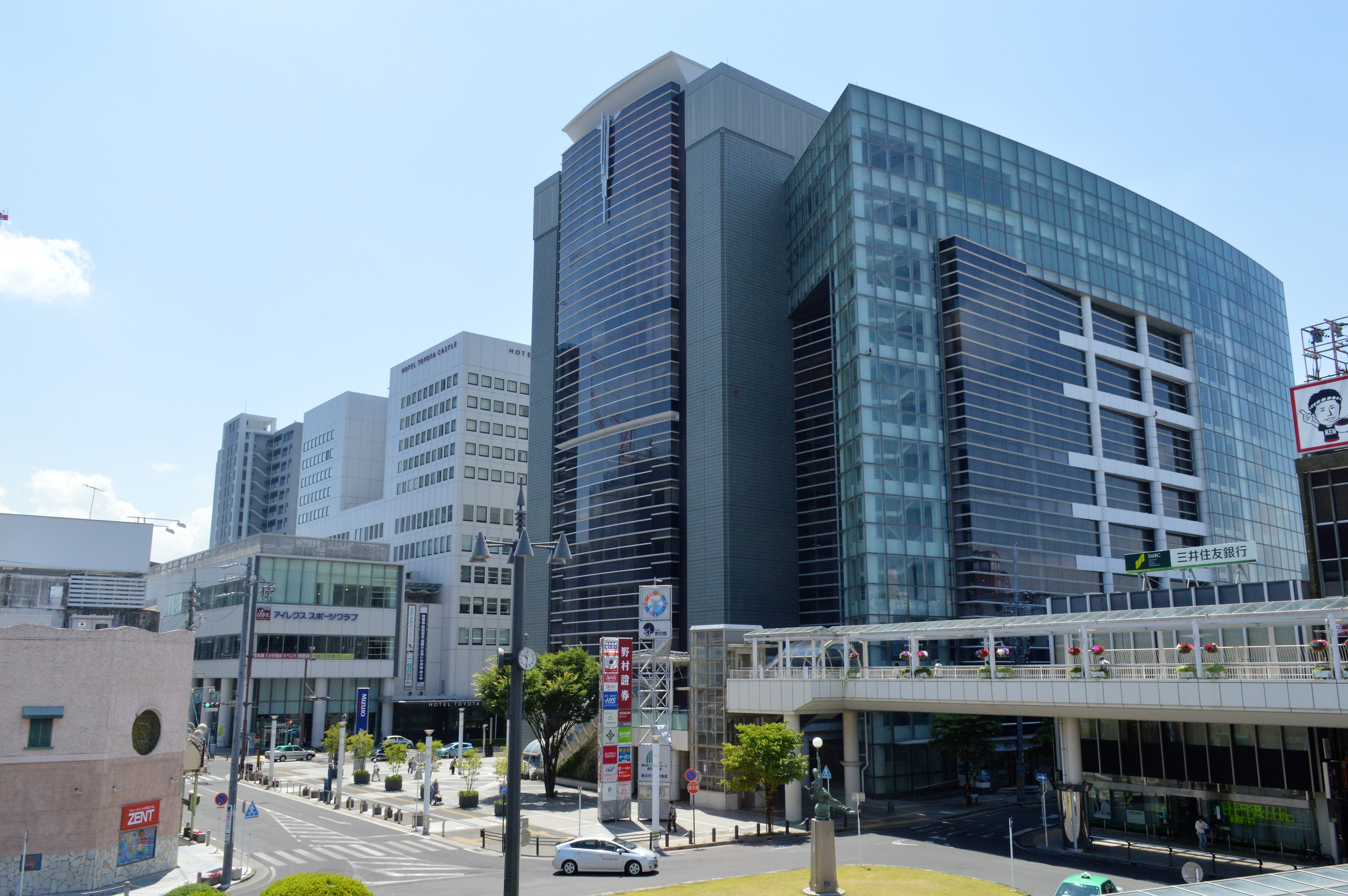
Toyota City

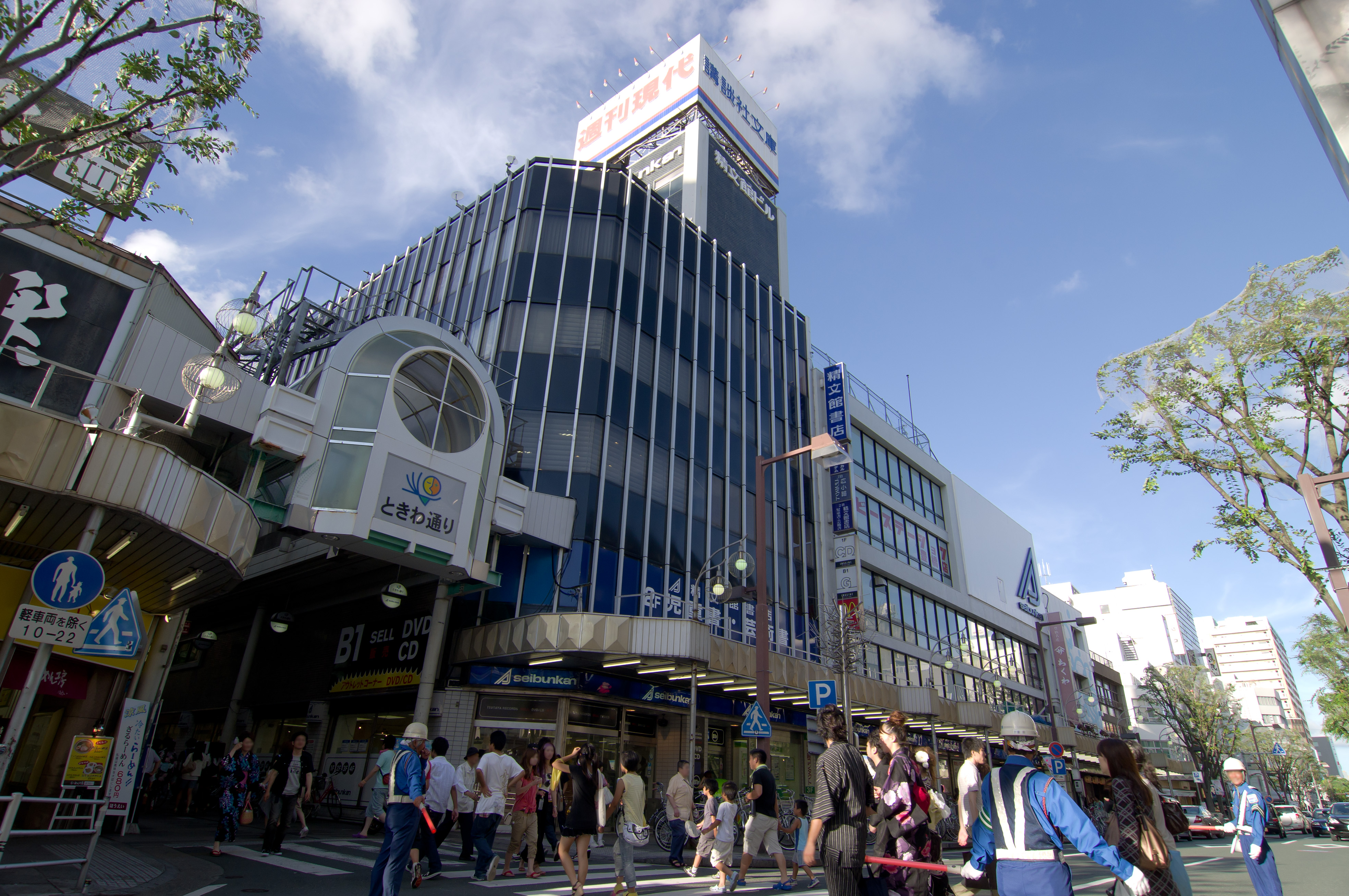
Toyohashi City

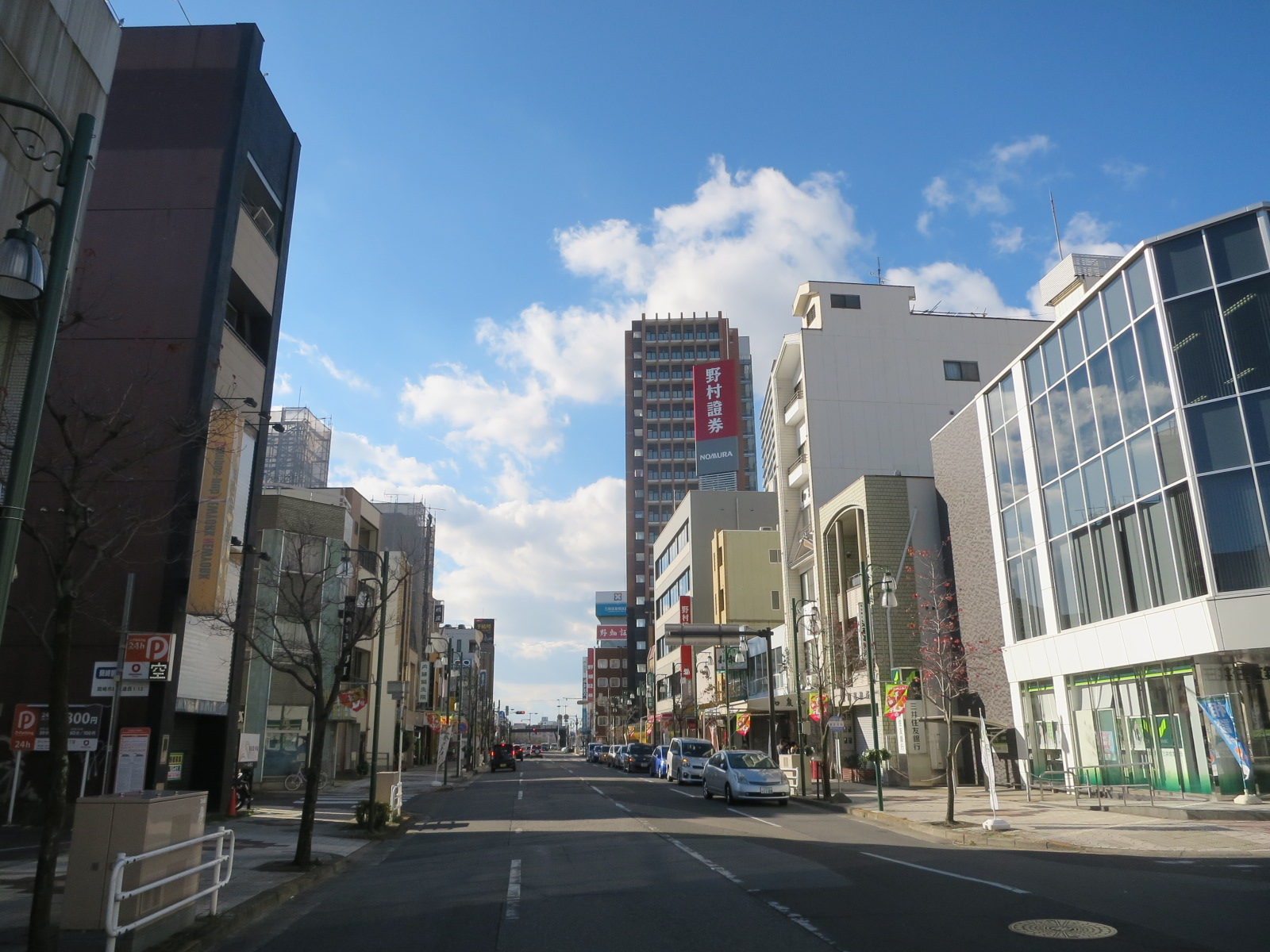
Okazaki City

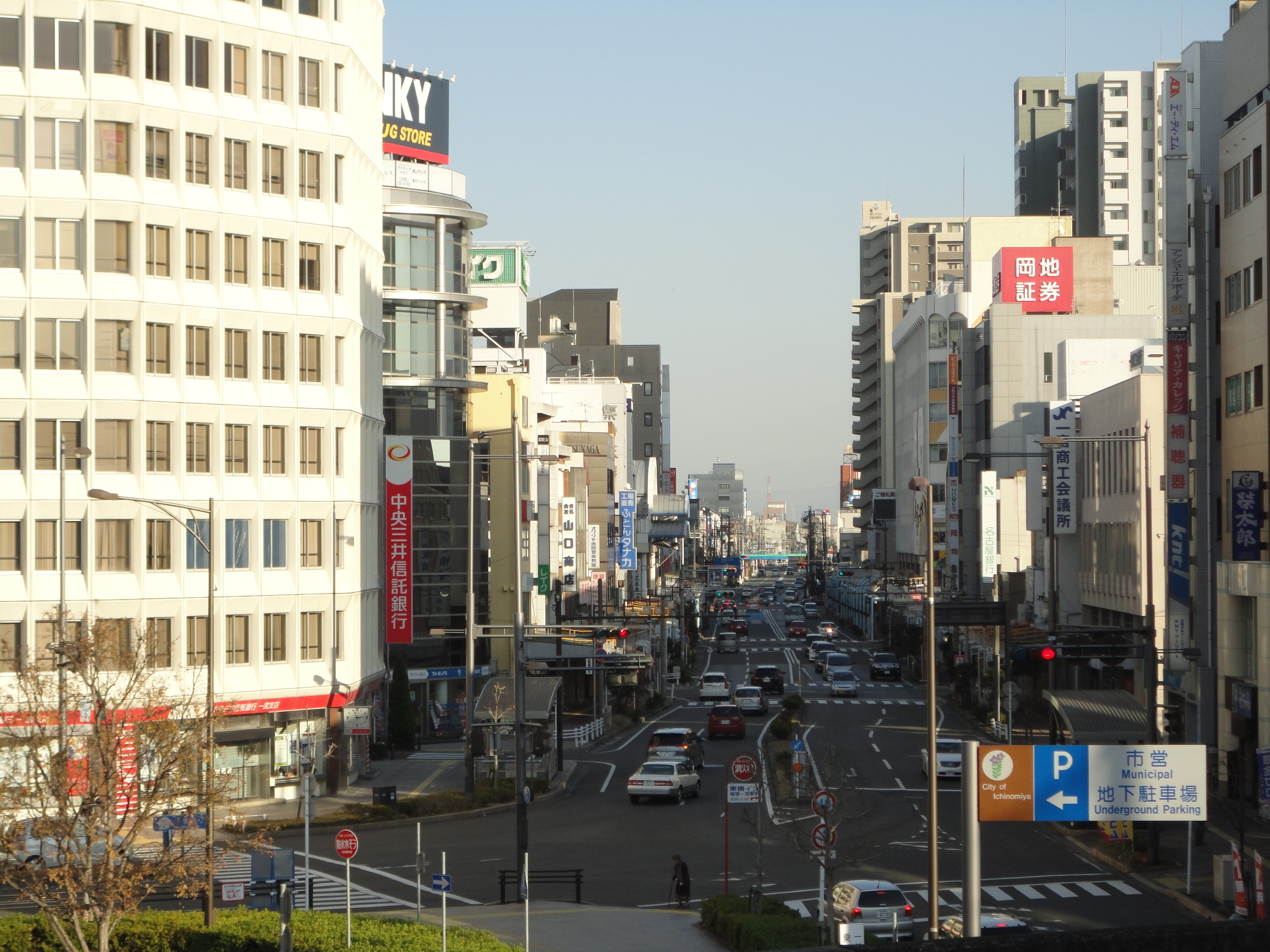
Ichinomiya City

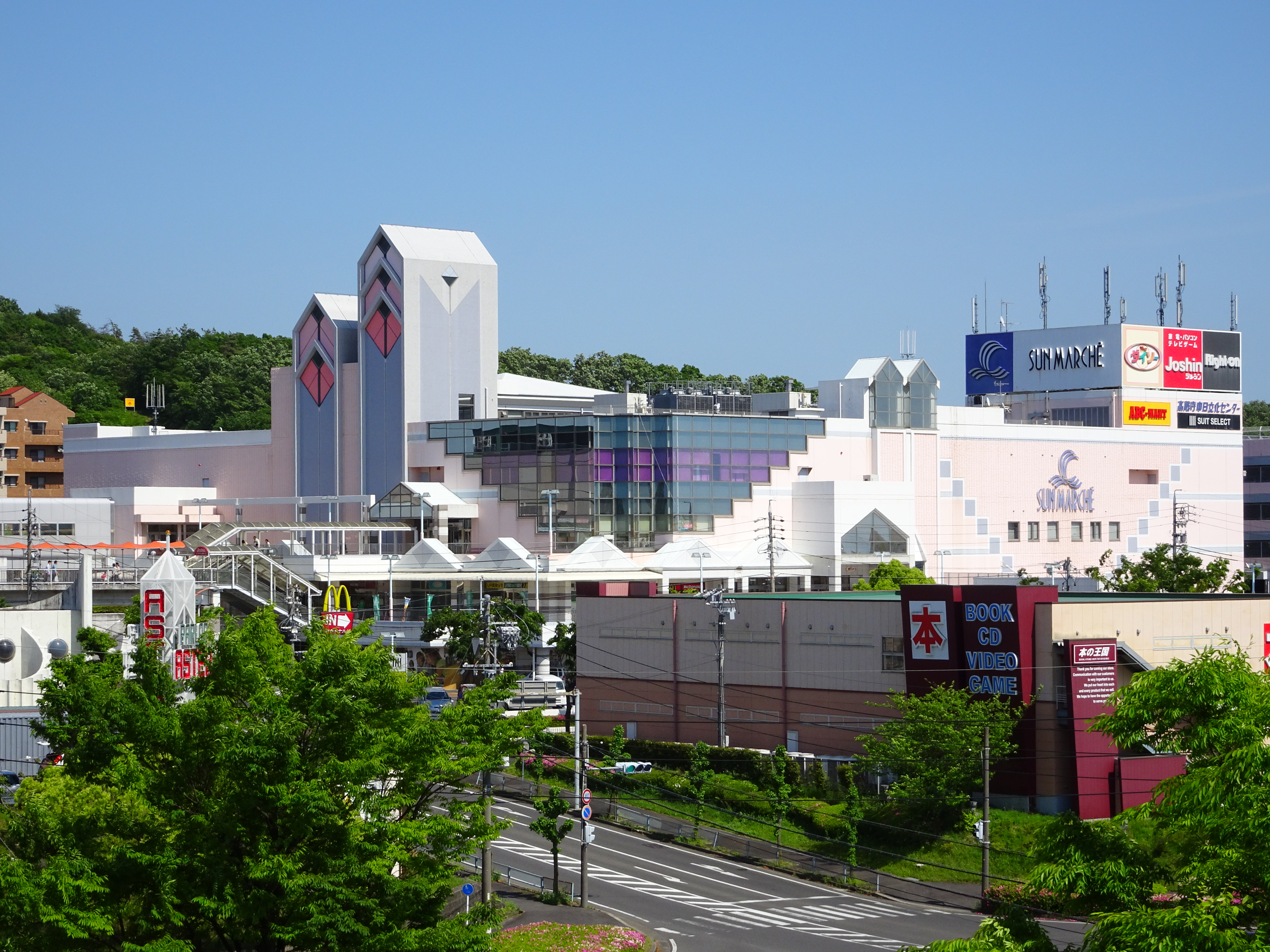
Kasugai City

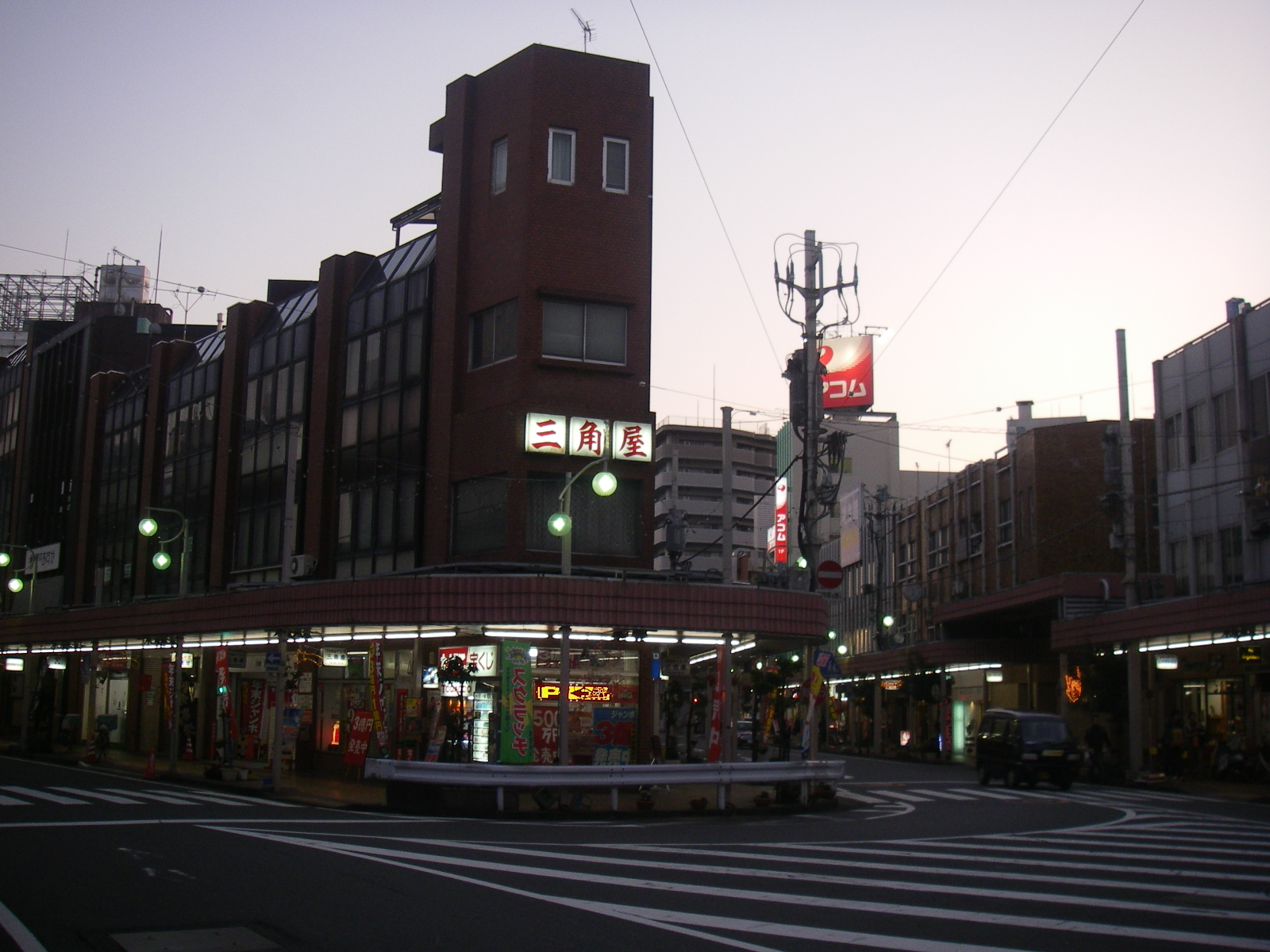
Fuji City

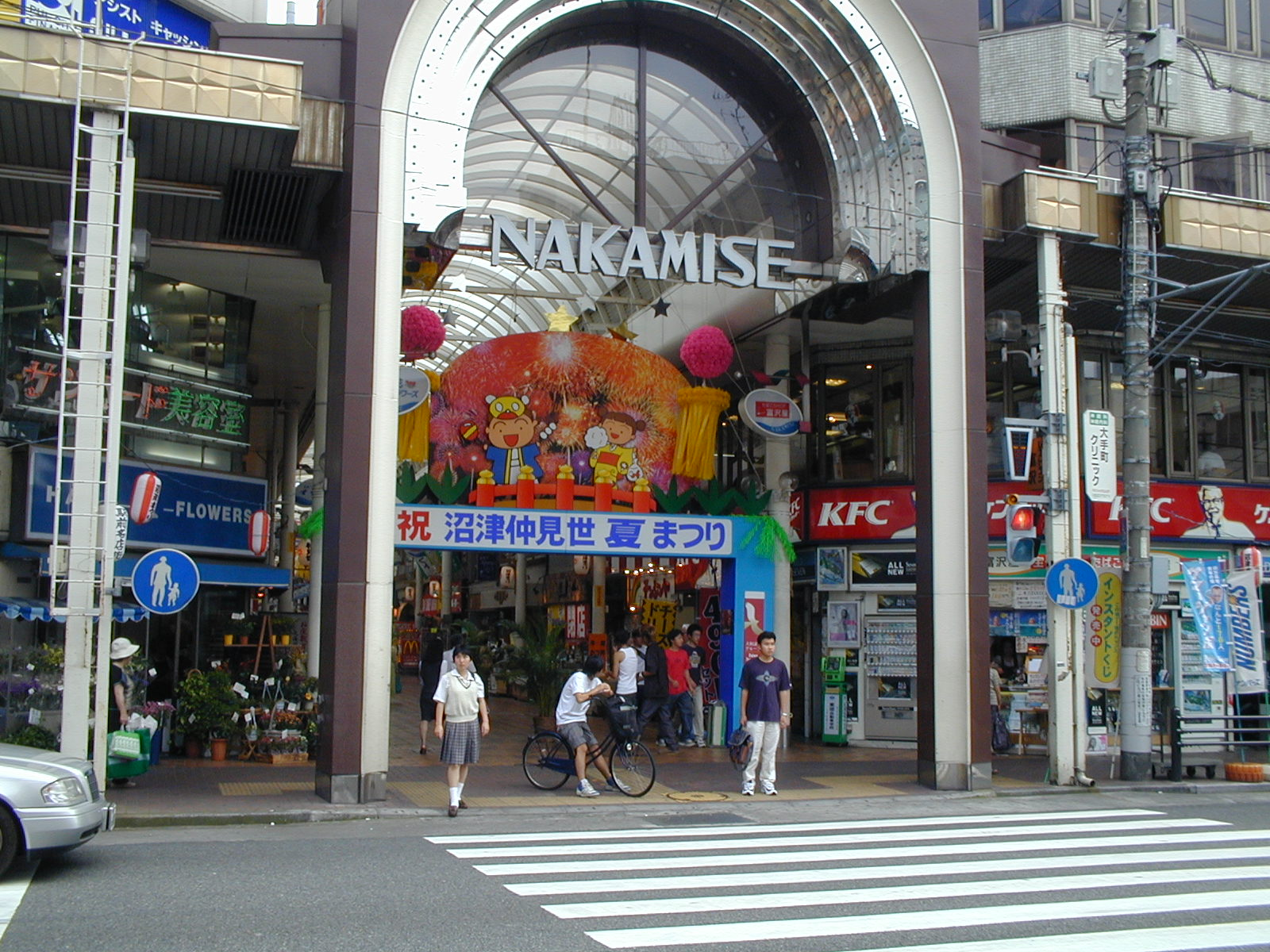
Numazu City

== Companies ==
- Toyota Motor Company
- Yamaha
- Kawai Musical Instruments
- Suzuki
- Roland Corporation

== Universities ==
- Nagoya University
- Nanzan University
- Nagoya Institute of Technology
- Gifu University
- Mie University
- Chukyo University
- Toyohashi University of Technology
- Nihon University College of International Relations
- Shizuoka University

== Airports ==
- Chūbu Centrair International Airport
- Nagoya Regional Airport
- Shizuoka Airport

== Sports clubs ==
=== Baseball ===
- Chunichi Dragons

=== Football ===
- Júbilo Iwata
- Nagoya Grampus
- Shimizu S-Pulse
- F.C. Gifu
- Honda F.C.
- F.C. Kariya

=== Basketball ===
- San-en NeoPhoenix
- SeaHorses Mikawa
- Nagoya Diamond Dolphins

== Power generation ==
The Hamaoka Nuclear Power Plant is located within the Tōkai region.

== See also ==
- Hokuriku region
- Kōshin'etsu region
- Shin'etsu region
