= Kiyoo Mogi =

Japanese seismologist (1929–2021)

- Born: 1929; Yamagata Prefecture
- Died: 6 June 2021 (aged 91–92)
- Known for: Mogi doughnut hypothesis; Mogi model; Former chair of the Japanese Coordinating Committee for Earthquake Prediction
- Scientific career
- Fields: Seismology; Seismotectonics
- Institutions: Director, Earthquake Research Institute, University of Tokyo; Professor, Nihon University

Kiyoo Mogi (茂木 清夫, Mogi Kiyoo; 1929 in Yamagata Prefecture, Japan–6 June 2021) was a prominent seismologist. He was regarded as Japan's foremost authority on earthquake prediction and was a chair of the Japanese Coordinating Committee for Earthquake Prediction (CCEP). Mogi was also a director of the University of Tokyo's Earthquake Research Institute, a professor at Nihon University and a professor emeritus at Tokyo University. Due to the seismic activity in Japan, Mogi also took an interest in the safety of nuclear power in Japan.

In 1969, Mogi predicted that there was a possibility of a shallow magnitude 8.0 earthquake in the Tōkai region of Japan, an area that has experienced a number of previous large earthquakes. Following the passing of the Large-Scale Earthquake Countermeasure Act, in 1978, Mogi was appointed to the newly created Earthquake Assessment Committee (EAC) for the expected Tokai earthquake, charged with warning the government if the quake was imminent. He went on to chair the ECA from 1991 until he resigned from the post in 1996 after failing to persuade the government of the need to take uncertainty into account when issuing warnings.

== Nuclear power ==
Following damage at the Kashiwazaki-Kariwa Nuclear Power Plant due to the 2007 Chūetsu offshore earthquake, Mogi called for the immediate closure of the Hamaoka Nuclear Power Plant, which was built close to the centre of the expected Tōkai earthquake despite his 1969 prediction. Previously, in 2004, he had stated that the issue 'is a critical problem which can bring a catastrophe to Japan through a man-made disaster'.

== Mogi doughnut hypothesis ==
In 1969, Mogi proposed a hypothesis for earthquake prediction, now known as the 'Mogi doughnut hypothesis', that major earthquakes tend to occur in an unusually seismically calm area surrounded by a ring of unusually high seismic activity. The Mogi doughnut is one of several pattern hypotheses that have been proposed.

== Mogi model ==
11 - magma chamber

In 1958, Mogi was responsible for a major advance in understanding the dynamics of volcanos. After studying data from several sources, he concluded that a mathematical solution developed by Yamakawa in 1955 could be used in the modelling of the deformation of a volcano caused by pressure changes in its magma chamber. The 'Mogi model' (also known as the 'Mogi-Yamakawa model') subsequently became the first commonly used quantitative method in volcanology, and is still widely used today.

== Bibliography ==
- Experimental Rock Mechanics (2006)
- Earthquake Prediction (1985)

== See also ==
- Hamaoka Nuclear Power Plant
- Fukushima I nuclear accidents
- Katsuhiko Ishibashi
- Nuclear power in Japan
- Geology of Japan
- Pacific Ring of Fire
