= Hironari Miyazawa =

Japanese physicist (1927–2023)

- Born: 1927; Tokyo, Japan
- Died: 2023 (aged 95–96)
- Education: University of Tokyo
- Known for: Supersymmetry; Goldberger–Miyazawa–Oehme sum rule
- Scientific career
- Fields: Physics
- Workplaces: University of Tokyo; University of Chicago; Institute for Advanced Study; University of Minnesota; Kanagawa University; Okayama Institute for Quantum Physics
- Doctoral advisor: Takahiko Yamanouchi
- Other academic advisors: Masao Kotani; Gregor Wentzel; Enrico Fermi

Hironari Miyazawa (宮沢 弘成, Miyazawa Hironari; 1927–2023) was a Japanese particle and nuclear physicist, known for his work in supersymmetry, which was first proposed by Miyazawa in 1966 as a possible symmetry between mesons and baryons.

Miyazawa studied physics and received his undergraduate degree in 1950 at the University of Tokyo. He joined the faculty after he received his doctorate in 1953 from the University of Tokyo, and became a full professor of physics in 1968. In 1988 he moved to the Kanagawa University and served there until 1998. He was a professor emeritus of the University of Tokyo. During these periods, he also served visiting professorships at the University of Chicago and the University of Minnesota, and directorship at the Meson Science Laboratory, the University of Tokyo.

From 1953 to 1955 he was a research associate at the Institute for Nuclear Studies, the University of Chicago, where he conducted research on theoretical nuclear physics under Gregor Wentzel and Enrico Fermi. A supersymmetry relating mesons and baryons was first proposed, in the context of hadronic physics, by Miyazawa in 1966. This supersymmetry did not involve spacetime, that is, it concerned internal symmetry, and was broken badly. Miyazawa's work was largely ignored at the time.

Hironari Miyazawa died in 2023.

== See also ==
- Superalgebra
- Superstring theory

== Bibliography ==
- S. Matsuda; T. Muta; R. Sasaki, eds. (1989). Perspectives on Particle Physics: From Mesons and Resonances to Quarks and Strings - In Commemoration of the Sixtieth Birthday of Professor H. Miyazawa. World Scientific. ISBN 978-9971-5-0589-9.
