= Takahiko Yamanouchi =

Japanese physicist

- Born: July 2, 1902; Kanagawa
- Died: October 14, 1986 (aged 84)
- Education: Imperial University of Tokyo
- Known for: Group theory in quantum mechanics
- Awards: Japan Academy Prize; The Order of the Rising Sun, Gold and Silver Star
- Scientific career
- Fields: Physics
- Workplaces: Imperial University of Tokyo; Tokyo Higher School; University of Tokyo
- Doctoral advisor: Kwan-ichi Terazawa
- Doctoral students: Hironari Miyazawa
- Other notable students: Masatoshi Koshiba

Takahiko Yamanouchi (山内 恭彦, Yamanouchi Takahiko; July 2, 1902 – October 14, 1986) was a Japanese theoretical physicist, known for group theory in quantum mechanics first proposed by Yamanouchi in Japan.

Yamanouchi was born in Kanagawa, graduated in physics from the Imperial University of Tokyo in 1926. From 1926 to 1927 he was a research associate at the Imperial University of Tokyo. From 1927 to 1931 he was a professor at the Tokyo Higher School. He joined the faculty of the Imperial University of Tokyo in 1929 as a lecturer of engineering and became a full professor in 1942. He was a professor of physics at the University of Tokyo from 1949 to his retirement in 1963. During 1959–1961 he was the dean of the faculty of science. In 1956 he was awarded the Japan Academy Prize for "application of group theory to the theory of atomic spectra".

== See also ==
- Group theory
- Quantum mechanics

== Bibliography ==
- Masao Kotani, ed. (1966). The Collection of essays dedicated to Takahiko Yamanouchi on the occasion of his sixtieth birthday. Executive Committee on the Commemoration of Dr. Yamanouchi's Sixtieth Birthday. OCLC 43866430.
