= Isao Imai (physicist) =

Japanese theoretical physicist

- Born: 7 October 1914; Dairen, Kwantung Leased Territory
- Died: 24 October 2004 (aged 90)
- Education: Imperial University of Tokyo
- Known for: Imai–Lamla method fluid mechanics mathematical physics
- Awards: Asahi Prize; Japan Academy Prize; Person of Cultural Merit; Order of Culture; Grand Cordon of the Order of the Sacred Treasure
- Scientific career
- Fields: Physics
- Workplaces: Imperial University of Tokyo; Osaka University; Kogakuin University
- Doctoral advisor: Kwan-ichi Terazawa

Isao Imai (今井 功, Imai Isao; 7 October 1914 – 24 October 2004) was a Japanese theoretical physicist, known for fluid mechanics and mathematical physics.

Imai was born on 7 October 1914 in Dairen. A few years later, his family returned to Kobe, where he spent his childhood. He skipped one grade in elementary school and another in middle school, and he entered the First Higher School. He proceeded to the Imperial University of Tokyo, majoring in physics, and graduated at the age of 21. Upon his graduation in 1936, he was appointed assistant to Susumu Tomotika in the newly established Imperial University of Osaka. Two years later, he returned to the Imperial University of Tokyo as a lecturer, and in 1942 was promoted to assistant professor. From 1950, he was professor of physics in the faculty of science until his official retirement from the University of Tokyo in 1975. He was concurrently a member of the Aeronautical Research Institute, the University of Tokyo (1938–1964). He was also visiting professor at a number of overseas universities, the University of Maryland (1955–1957), Aix-Marseille University (1960), D.V.L. Aachen (1961–1962), Cornell University (1965–1966, 1977), and the Technical University of Aachen (1969). On his retirement from the University of Tokyo, he became professor emeritus and moved to Osaka University as professor of mechanical engineering in the faculty of engineering science (1975–1978), and then to Kogakuin University (1978–1987), where he got the title of professor emeritus. In 1994 he became an academician of the Japan Academy.

== Selected literature ==
- Imai, Isao (2012) [First published 1992], M. Hazewinkel (ed.), Applied hyperfunction theory, Mathematics and its Applications (Book 8), New York: Springer-Verlag, ISBN 978-0-7923-1507-0

== Bibliography ==
- M. Hafez, ed. (2004). "Dedication to Professor Emeritus Isao Imai" (PDF). Comput. Fluid Dyn. J. 13 (3): 365–376. Archived from the original (PDF) on 16 July 2011.
