= Masao Kotani =

Japanese physicist

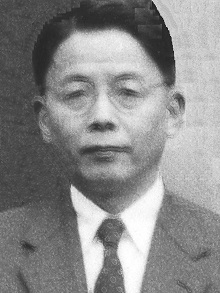
- Masao Kotani 1952 in London
- Born: January 14, 1906; Kyoto
- Died: June 6, 1993 (aged 87)
- Education: Imperial University of Tokyo
- Known for: molecular physics biophysics
- Awards: Japan Academy Prize; Tohyoh Rayon Prize; Fujiwara Prize; International Society of Quantum Biology Award; Person of Cultural Merit; Order of Culture
- Scientific career
- Fields: Physics
- Workplaces: Imperial University of Tokyo; Osaka University; Tokyo Science University
- Doctoral advisor: Kwan-ichi Terazawa

Masao Kotani (小谷 正雄, Kotani Masao; January 14, 1906 – June 6, 1993) was a Japanese theoretical physicist, known for molecular physics and biophysics.

Kotani was born in Kyoto and spent his primary and middle school days in Osaka. He moved to Tokyo to enter the First Higher School and then the Imperial University of Tokyo. In 1929, he received his BSc degree in physics and was appointed as a lecturer at the faculty of engineering in the Imperial University of Tokyo. Three years later, he became an associate professor in the physics department. In 1943, he received the degree of DSc and was promoted to a full professor. In 1965, he moved to Osaka University as a professor in the faculty of engineering science. He retired from the chair in 1969. One year later, he was elected president of the Tokyo Science University, where he served as president for three terms, a total of 12 years, and retired in 1982. He was associated with the Tokyo Science University until his death, as an expert advisor to its two institutes for general and life sciences.

Kotani received many awards. He was a recipient of the Japan Academy Prize in 1948. This was for his joint work with Sin-Itiro Tomonaga on the theory of magnetrons and microwave circuits. He received the 1969 Tohyoh Rayon Prize for the work in quantum mechanical study of molecular electronic structure, the 1974 Fujiwara Award for his contribution to the basic studies of molecular physics and biophysics, and the 1977 International Society of Quantum Biology Award. In 1977, the Japanese government commended him in recognition of his cultural services. In 1980, he received an Order of Culture.

== See also ==
- International Academy of Quantum Molecular Science
- Masao Kotani: in "Early Ideas in the History of Quantum Chemistry"
