= Earthquake Research Institute, University of Tokyo =

Institute in affiliation with University of Tokyo

Coordinates: 35°43′7.3″N 139°45′34.8″E

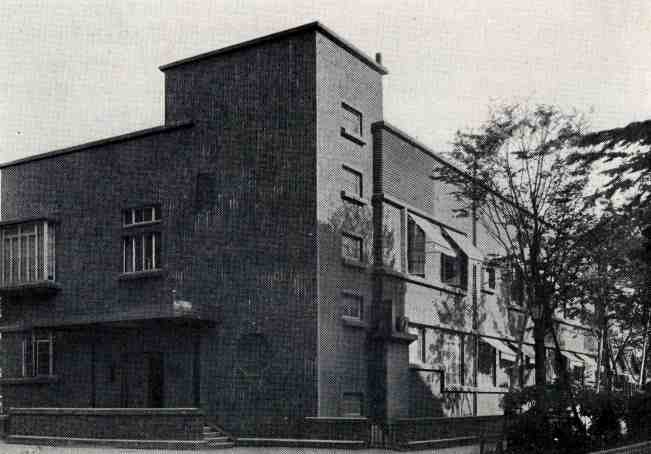
- Original institute building designed by Yoshikazu Uchida
- Established: 1925
- Focus: Astronomy
- Director: Takashi Furumura
- Key people: Akitsune Imamura
- Address: 1-1-1 Yayoi, Bunkyō
- Location: Bunkyō, Tokyo, Japan
- Website: https://www.eri.u-tokyo.ac.jp/en/

Earthquake Research Institute, University of Tokyo (ERI; 東京大学地震研究所 Tokyo Daigaku Jishin Kenkyu-jo) is an institute in affiliation with University of Tokyo. Many fellows research on various topics about Seismology and volcanology. The Institute is represented on the national Coordinating Committee for Earthquake Prediction.

== History ==
Earthquake Research Institute, University of Tokyo was founded in 1925. Japan was struck The Great Kantō earthquake on Saturday, September 1, 1923, and after this earthquake, it was advocated the need for a research center about Seismology and volcanology. The building is constructed in the Hongō campus, University of Tokyo. The building was designed by Yoshikazu Uchida, and he designed it very strongly to withstand a big earthquake.

== Organizational structure ==
- Research Division
  - Division of Earth Mechanics
  - Division of Geodynamics
  - Division of Monitoring and Computational Geoscience
  - Division of Disaster Mitigation Science
- Affiliated Center
  - Earthquake Prediction Research Center
  - Earthquake Observation Center
  - Earthquake Information Center
  - Volcano Research Center
  - Ocean Hemisphere Research Center
- Others
  - Outreach Program
  - Office of International Earthquake and Volcano Research Promotion

== Former Members ==
- IMAMURA, Akitune
- KANEMORI, Hiroo
- KAWASUMI, Hiroshi
- MOGI, Kiyoo
- TERADA, Torahiko
