= Coordinating Committee for Earthquake Prediction =

Committee in Japan

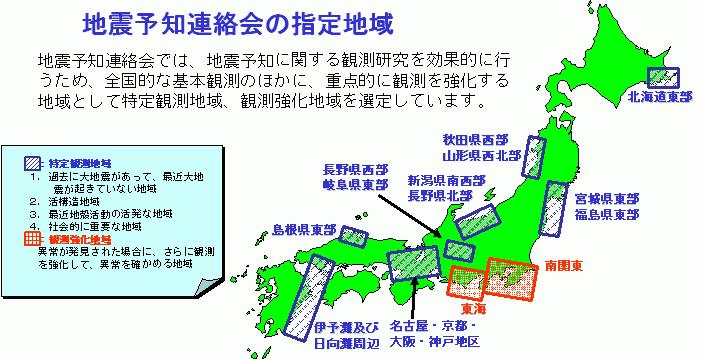
Areas of Specified Observation and Areas of Intensified Observation by CCEP

The Coordinating Committee for Earthquake Prediction (CCEP) (Japanese: 地震予知連絡会, Jishin Yochi Renraku-kai) in Japan was founded in April 1969, as part of the Geodesy Council's Second Earthquake Prediction Plan, in order to carry out a comprehensive evaluation of earthquake data in Japan. The committee consists of 30 members and meets four times each year, as well as publishing a report on its activities twice each year. The CCEP brings together representatives from 20 governmental bodies and universities engaged in earthquake prediction and research. It has a secretariat within the Ministry of Land, Infrastructure, Transport and Tourism.

== History ==
The first moves towards the committee were taken after earthquake researchers published Earthquake Prediction - Current Status and Action Plan in 1962. This was adopted by the General Assembly of Geodesy Council with the launch of their first prediction plan in 1964. Following earthquakes in 1964, 1965, and 1968 the EEPC was founded to coordinate future prediction activities.

== Geographical Areas of Observation ==
In order to focus future work, based on the geological evidence, and as well as the prediction of a Tōkai earthquake in the relatively near future, in 1970, the CCEP designated certain areas of Japan as Areas of Specified Observation or Areas of Intensified Observation. The Tōkai region was upgraded to an Area of Intensified Observation in 1974.

By 1978, when some of the boundaries were also changed, eight Areas of Specified Observation and two Areas of Intensified Observation had been designated.

=== Areas of Intensified Observation ===
- South Kantō
- Tōkai region

== Participating organisations ==
The following organisations are represented on the CCEP:

=== Universities ===
- Institute of Seismology and Volcanology, Hokkaido University
- Research Center for Prediction of Earthquakes and Volcanic Eruptions, Tohoku University
- School of Life and Environmental Sciences, University of Tsukuba
- School of Science, University of Tokyo
- Earthquake Research Institute, University of Tokyo
- Volcanic Fluid Research Center, Tokyo Institute of Technology
- Research Center for Seismology, Volcanology and Disaster Mitigation, Nagoya University
- Department of Geophysics, Kyoto University
- Disaster Prevention Research Institute, Kyoto University
- Geospheric Structure and Dynamics Laboratory, Tottori University
- Institute of Seismology and Volcanology, Kyushu University
- Nansei-Toko Observatory for Earthquakes and Volcanoes, Kagoshima University
- Institute of Statistical Mathematics

=== Governmental organisations ===
- National Research Institute for Earth Science and Disaster Prevention
- Japan Agency for Marine-Earth Science and Technology
- Geological Survey of Japan, National Institute of Advanced Industrial Science and Technology
- Hydrographic and Oceanographic Department, Japan Coast Guard
- Japan Meteorological Agency / Meteorological Research Institute
- Geospatial Information Authority of Japan

=== Other bodies ===
- Tono research institute of Earthquake Science
- Hot Springs Research Institute, Kanagawa Prefecture

== See also ==
- Kiyoo Mogi, former chair of the CCEP
- Seismicity in Japan
- Nuclear Power in Japan - Seismicity
