= Arndt von Haeseler =

German bioinformatician and evolutionary biologist

- Born: 28 February 1959 (age 67); Bremen
- Education: Bielefeld University (PhD)
- Scientific career
- Fields: Computational phylogenetics
- Workplaces: University of Düsseldorf; University of Vienna; Medical University of Vienna; Max F. Perutz Laboratories
- Thesis: Rekonstruktion phylogenetischer Bäume mit Hilfe von Varianten der Vier-Punkt-Bedingung (1988)
- Doctoral advisor: Andreas Dress; Hans-Georg Carstens
- Doctoral students: Korbinian Strimmer
- Website: www.cibiv.at/~haeseler/

Arndt von Haeseler (born 28 February 1959) is a German bioinformatician and evolutionary biologist. He is the scientific director of the Max F. Perutz Laboratories at the Vienna Biocenter and a professor of bioinformatics at the University of Vienna and the Medical University of Vienna.

== Education ==
Arndt von Haeseler obtained a doctorate in mathematics from Bielefeld University in 1988 under the supervision of Andreas Dress and Hans-Georg Carstens. He habilitated in 1994 at the Department of Zoology of LMU Munich, where he remained as a lecturer until 1998.

== Research and career ==
From 1998 until 2001, von Haeseler was a group leader at the Max Planck Institute for Evolutionary Anthropology in Leipzig. From 2001 until 2005, he was professor of bioinformatics at the University of Düsseldorf. He was a group leader in bioinformatics at Forschungszentrum Jülich. In 2005, he joined the Max F. Perutz Laboratories (MFPL) in Vienna, where he leads the Center for Integrative Bioinformatics Vienna (CIBIV). He is a professor of bioinformatics at the University of Vienna and the Medical University of Vienna. From 2017 to 2020, he was the scientific director of the MFPL (since 2019 Max Perutz Labs). At the University Vienna, he was the dean of the Center for Molecular Biology. At the Medical University of Vienna, he was the head of the Department for Medical Biochemistry.

His research focuses on developing computational methods for the reconstruction of phylogenetic trees. He co-authored the phylogenetics software packages TREEFINDER, TREE-PUZZLE, and its successor, IQ-TREE. However, the 2004 article about TREEFINDER in BMC Evolutionary Biology was retracted in 2015 due to the license change. More precisely, coauthor Gangolf Jobb had forbidden use of the software in the USA and several European countries as an anti-immigration political statement.

He sits on the editorial boards of Molecular Biology and Evolution and BMC Evolutionary Biology.

=== Awards and honours ===
In 2021, 2022 and 2023, Arndt von Haeseler was awarded "Highly Cited Researcher".

In 2015, von Haeseler was elected as a corresponding member of the mathematics and science class of the Austrian Academy of Sciences.

Since 1999, he holds an honorary professorship in theoretical biology at the University of Leipzig.
