= Foulds =

Foulds is a surname. Notable people with the surname include:

- Adam Foulds (born 1974), British novelist and poet
- Bert Foulds (1919–1993), English footballer
- Fred Foulds (born 1935), English cricketer
- Garry Foulds (born 1956), Australian rules footballer
- Geoff Foulds (1939–2025), English snooker player
- Gerry Scott Foulds (1944–2007), English production designer
- Jim Foulds (born 1937), Canadian politician
- John Foulds (1880–1939), English classical music composer
- June Foulds (1934–2020), British sprinter
- Matty Foulds (born 1998), English footballer
- Neal Foulds (born 1963), English snooker player
- William C. Foulds (1887–1954), Canadian football Hall of Famer

== See also ==
- Robinson–Foulds metric
