= Supertree =

Phylogenetic tree combining multiple sub-trees

A supertree is a single phylogenetic tree assembled from a combination of smaller phylogenetic trees, which may have been assembled using different datasets (e.g. morphological and molecular) or a different selection of taxa. Supertree algorithms can highlight areas where additional data would most usefully resolve any ambiguities. The input trees of a supertree should behave as samples from the larger tree.

== Construction methods ==
The construction of a supertree scales exponentially with the number of taxa included; therefore for a tree of any reasonable size, it is not possible to examine every possible supertree and weigh its success at combining the input information. Heuristic methods are thus essential, although these methods may be unreliable; the result extracted is often biased or affected by irrelevant characteristics of the input data.

The most well known method for supertree construction is Matrix Representation with Parsimony (MRP), in which the input source trees are represented by matrices with 0s, 1s, and ?s (i.e., each edge in each source tree defines a bipartition of the leafset into two disjoint parts, and the leaves on one side get 0, the leaves on the other side get 1, and the missing leaves get ?), and the matrices are concatenated and then analyzed using heuristics for maximum parsimony. Another approach for supertree construction include a maximum likelihood version of MRP called "MRL" (matrix representation with likelihood), which analyzes the same MRP matrix but uses heuristics for maximum likelihood instead of for maximum parsimony to construct the supertree.

The Robinson-Foulds distance is the most popular of many ways of measuring how similar a supertree is to the input trees. It is a metric for the number of clades from the input trees that are retained in the supertree. Robinson-Foulds optimization methods search for a supertree that minimizes the total (summed) Robinson-Foulds differences between the (binary) supertree and each input tree. In this case the supertree can hence be view as the median of the input tree according to the Robinson-Foulds distance. Alternative approaches have been developed to infer median supertree based on different metrics, e.g. relying on triplet or quartet decomposition of the trees.

A recent innovation has been the construction of Maximum Likelihood supertrees and the use of "input-tree-wise" likelihood scores to perform tests of two supertrees.

Additional methods include the Min Cut Supertree approach, Most Similar Supertree Analysis (MSSA), Distance Fit (DFIT) and Quartet Fit (QFIT), implemented in the software CLANN.

== Application ==
Supertrees have been applied to produce phylogenies of many groups, notably the angiosperms, eukaryotes and mammals. They have also been applied to larger-scale problems such as the origins of diversity, vulnerability to extinction, and evolutionary models of ecological structure.
