= Mesquite (disambiguation) =

Mesquite is a common name for several small trees in the genus Prosopis native to North American deserts.

Mesquite may also refer to:

== Biology ==
- Mesquite lizard
- Mesquite mouse
- Mesquite (software), an open-source software program for evolutionary biology

== Places in the United States ==
- Mesquite, Nevada
  - Mesquite Airport
- Mesquite, New Mexico
- Mesquite, Texas, a suburb of Dallas
- Mesquite, Borden County, Texas, a former town
- Mesquite, Starr County, Texas
- Mesquite Creek, Arizona
- Mesquite Hills, California
- Mesquite Mountains, California
- Mesquite Solar project, Arizona

== Other uses ==
- USCGC Mesquite (WLB-305)
- Mesquite Bosque
- Mesquite ProRodeo
- Mesquite Kickers

== See also ==
- Mesquite High School (disambiguation)
- Mezquita (disambiguation)
