= Treefinder =

TreeFinder
- Developer: Gangolf Jobb
- Stable release: March 2011 / 1 March 2011
- Available in: English
- Type: Bioinformatics tool
- Website: www.treefinder.de

Treefinder is a computer program for the likelihood-based reconstruction of phylogenetic trees from molecular sequences. It was written by Gangolf Jobb, a former researcher at LMU Munich, Germany, and was originally released in 2004. Treefinder is free of charge, though the most recent license prohibits its use in the USA and eight European countries.

== Overview ==
A platform-independent graphical environment integrates a standard suite of analyses: phylogeny reconstruction, bootstrap analysis, model selection, hypothesis testing, tree calibration, manipulation of trees and sequence data. Treefinder is scriptable through a proprietary scripting language called TL.

Treefinder has an efficient tree search algorithm that can infer trees with thousands of species within a short time. Result trees are displayed and can then be saved as a reconstruction report, which may serve as an input for further analysis, for example hypothesis testing. The report contains all information about the tree and the models used. Treefinder also supports exporting results as NEWICK or NEXUS files.

The software supports a broad collection of models of sequence evolution. The June 2008 release implements 7 models of nucleotide substitution (HKY, TN, J1, J2, J3 (= TIM), TVM, GTR), 14 empirical models of amino acid substitution (BLOSUM, cpREV, Dayhoff, JTT, LG, mtArt, mtMam, mtREV, PMB, rtREV, betHIV, witHIV, VT, WAG), 4 substitution models of structured rRNA (bactRNA, eukRNA, euk23RNA, mitoRNA), the 6-state "Dayhoff Groups" protein model (DG), 2-state and 3-state models of DNA (GTR3, GTR2), a parametric mixed model (MIX) mixing the empirical models of proteins or rRNA, and also a user-definable GTR-type model (MAP) mapping characters to states as needed. Three models of among-site rate heterogeneity are available (Gamma, Gamma+I, I), which can be combined with any of the substitution models. One can assume different models for different partitions of a sequence alignment, and partitions may be assumed to evolve at different speeds. All parameters of the models can be estimated from the data by maximization of likelihood. Certain TL expressions, the "model expressions", allow the concise notation of complex models, together with their parameters and optimization modes.

As of November 2015, Treefinder's original publication from 2004 has been cited more than 700 times in the scientific literature.

== Controversy ==
On February 1, 2015, Jobb disallowed the use of Treefinder in the USA in order to make a political statement. The author again changed the license terms on October 1, 2015 to exclude use in Germany, Austria, France, the Netherlands, Belgium, Great Britain, Sweden, and Denmark - countries he claimed "host most of the non-european immigrants". In an accompanying statement, he decried the handling of the European migrant crisis by European countries. The journal BMC Evolutionary Biology that published the original application note has since retracted it, stating that the license change violated the journal's policy.

== See also ==
- Computational phylogenetics
- Molecular phylogeny
