= Four leaves =

Four leaves may refer to:

- Four Leaves, Japanese boyband of the 1960s and 1970s
- Quatrefoil, decorative element in heraldry and traditional Christian symbolism

== See also ==
- Four-leaf clover
- Quartet distance, method of comparing two graph-theoretical trees based on groups of four leaves
