= Paup =

Paup or PAUP may refer to:

- PAUP*, a computer program for phylogenetics

people

- Donald C. Paup (born 1939), former American badminton player
