= Korbinian Strimmer =

German statistician

- Born: 1972 (age 53–54)
- Education: LMU Munich (PhD)
- Scientific career
- Fields: statistics; biomedicine; phylogenetics
- Workplaces: Leipzig University; Imperial College London; University of Manchester
- Thesis: Maximum Likelihood Methods in Molecular Phylogenetics (1997)
- Doctoral advisor: Arndt von Haeseler
- Website: strimmerlab.github.io/korbinian.html

Korbinian Strimmer (born 1972) is a German statistician specialising in biomedical data science. He is a professor in statistics at the University of Manchester.

== Education ==
Strimmer earned his PhD from LMU Munich in 1997 under the supervision of Arndt von Haeseler. His thesis is entitled Maximum Likelihood Methods in Molecular Phylogenetics.

== Research and career ==
Strimmer was a senior lecturer (W2 professor) at Leipzig University from 2007 until 2014. From 2014 until 2017, he was a reader at the Imperial College London, before becoming a professor in statistics at the University of Manchester in 2017.

He has co-authored biostatistical and bioinformatics software, including the phylogenetics package TREE-PUZZLE.

=== Awards and honours ===
From 2014 to 2017, Thomson Reuters and Clarivate Analytics ranked Strimmer four times consecutively among "The World's Most Influential Scientific Minds" in the computer science category according to the number of citations.
