= Archaeopteryx (software) =

Phylogenetic tree analyzation software

- Developer: Christian M. Zmasek
- Preview release: 0.11.75 / 2026.08.21
- Operating system: macOS, Linux, Windows
- Type: Bioinformatics, phylogenomics
- License: GPL3
- Website: cmzmasek.github.io/archaeopteryx/
- Repository: github.com/cmzmasek/archaeopteryx

Archaeopteryx is an interactive computer software program, written in Java, for viewing, editing, and analyzing phylogenetic trees. This type of program can be used for a variety of analyses of molecular data sets, but is particularly designed for phylogenomics. Besides tree description formats with limited expressiveness (such as Newick/New Hamphshire, Nexus), it also implements the phyloXML format. Archaeopteryx is the successor to Java program A Tree Viewer (ATV).
