= Mesquite (software) =

Mesquite: A modular system for evolutionary analysis
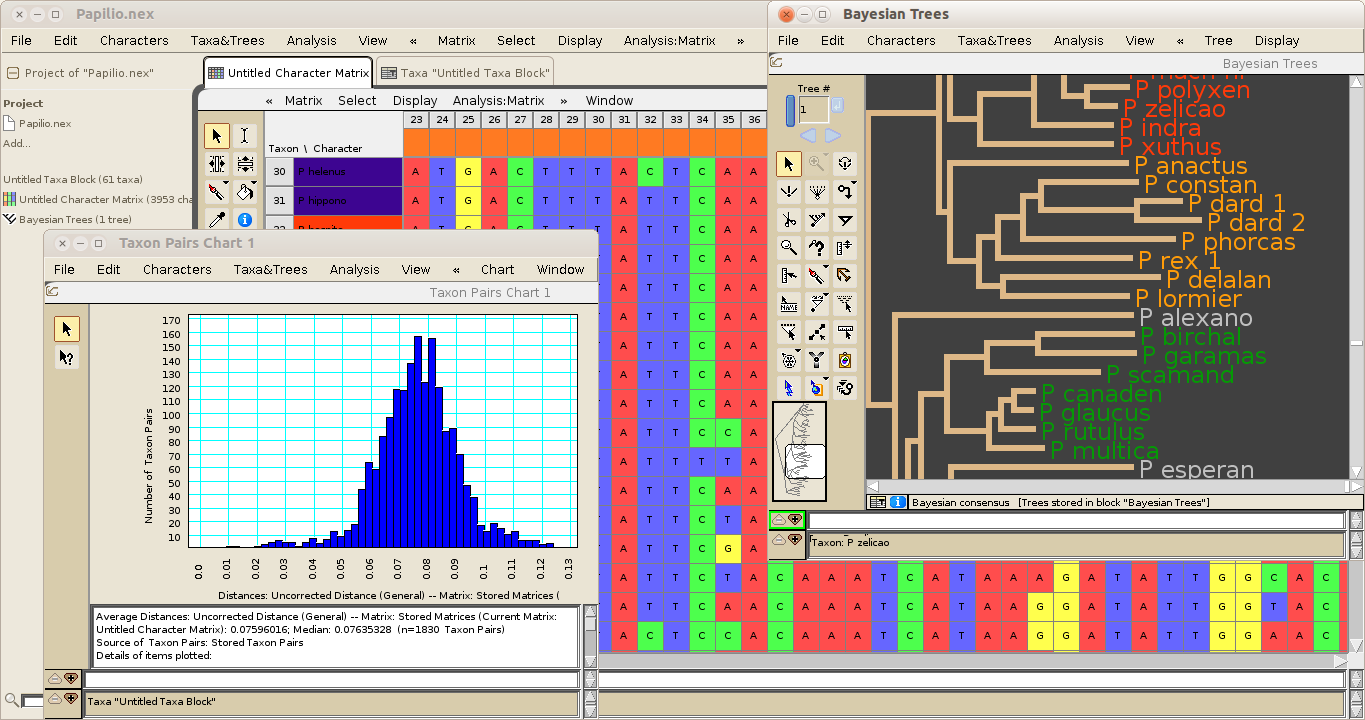
- Original authors: Wayne P. Maddison, David R. Maddison
- Release: March 14, 2001
- Stable release: 4.01 / July 9, 2025; 12 months ago
- Written in: Java
- Operating system: Macintosh, Windows, Unix-like
- Platform: Cross-platform
- Type: Science
- Website: www.mesquiteproject.org
- Repository: github.com/MesquiteProject/MesquiteCore

Mesquite is a software package primarily designed for phylogenetic analyses. It was developed as a successor to MacClade, when the authors recognized that implementing a modular architecture in MacClade would be infeasible. Mesquite is largely written in Java and uses NEXUS-formatted files as input. Mesquite is available as a compiled executable for Macintosh, Windows, and Unix-like platforms, and the source code is available on GitHub.

== Rationale ==
The architecture of Mesquite was explicitly designed to exploit the modularity and extensibility of Object-oriented programming. In practice, Mesquite modules are Java classes, usually concrete sub-classes of abstract class definitions. This modular architecture has afforded the development of additional packages that can be used as plug-ins to Mesquite.

== Scope ==
Mesquite provides a number of analyses including ancestral state estimation and diversification analysis. Mesquite also contains tools for simulating data such as species trees, gene trees, and DNA matrices. The base distribution of Mesquite affords interoperability with other programs, for such purposes as multiple sequence alignment (e.g. Clustal and MAFFT), as well as the ability to retrieve DNA sequence data from GenBank. Mesquite includes some rudimentary tools for phylogenetic tree estimation; however, the Zephyr package provides a Mesquite interface for interacting with other phylogenetic inference programs including RAxML, PAUP*, and GARLI.
