= Tokogeny =

Tokogeny or tocogeny is the biological relationship between parent and offspring, or more generally between ancestors and descendants.

Hennig introduced the concept of tokogeny in contrast to ontogeny and phylogeny in the context of character states: two character states are related ontogenetically if they are found within a single organism in different stages of the organism's development (e.g. the imaginal disks of an immature insect are ontogenetically related to adult features such as wings); two character states are related tokogenetically if they are found within a single species in different individuals (e.g. the varying horn sizes of male dung beetles Onthophagus taurus are tokogenetically related to each other); two character states are related phylogenetically if they are found within a single clade in different sub-clades (e.g. within Elateroidea, the presence and absence of bioluminescent abdominal segments establish a relationship between the lampyroid clade and the outgroup families).

In the tokogenetic system, shared characteristics are called traits.
