= Mezquita (disambiguation) =

Mezquita is the Spanish language word for mosque.

Mezquita may also refer to:

== Structures ==
- The Mezquita-Catedral, an architectural landmark in the city of Córdoba, Spain
- Mezquita de las Tornerias, the Center Foundation of Promotion of the Crafts, a former mosque in Toledo, Spain
- Mezquita-Iglesia de El Salvador, Toledo

== Populated places ==
- Mezquita de Jarque, a town in Aragón, Spain
- A Mezquita, a town in Galicia, Spain.

== Other ==
- José Jorge Mezquita García, a Valencian pilota professional player
- Mezquita (band), a Spanish rock music band.

== See also ==
- Mesquite (disambiguation)
