= MicrobeTrace =

Epidemiology open-source software platform

- Developer: Centers for Disease Control and Prevention Division of HIV/AIDS Prevention
- Release: July 1, 2017; 9 years ago
- Written in: TypeScript
- Platform: Web
- Type: Epidemiology
- License: Apache License 2.0
- Website: microbetrace.cdc.gov
- Repository: github.com/CDCgov/MicrobeTrace/

MicrobeTrace is an open-source, browser-based software platform developed by the Centers for Disease Control and Prevention (CDC) for the visualization and analysis of molecular epidemiology and transmission networks of infectious diseases.

The platform enables integration of pathogen genetic sequence data with epidemiologic and demographic information to support analysis in outbreak investigations and public health research.

== Functionality ==
MicrobeTrace provides interactive tools for visualization of transmission networks derived from genetic distance data, phylogenetic tree exploration, and integration of molecular, demographic, and epidemiologic datasets. The platform also supports temporal and geospatial analysis of infectious disease outbreaks. Because it operates within a web browser, analyses can be conducted locally without requiring external data upload.

== Applications ==
MicrobeTrace has been applied in studies of multiple infectious diseases across diverse geographic settings, including viral, bacterial, and parasitic pathogens.

=== HIV ===
The platform has been used in molecular epidemiology studies of HIV transmission, including outbreak investigations among people who inject drugs in the United States and analyses of transmission dynamics in international settings.

=== Viral hepatitis ===
MicrobeTrace has been used in genomic epidemiology investigations of hepatitis A and hepatitis C, including outbreak detection and transmission analysis in both community and institutional settings.

=== Bacterial and parasitic diseases ===
The software has also been applied in studies of bacterial and parasitic pathogens, including analyses of transmission dynamics of Neisseria gonorrhoeae, tuberculosis outbreak investigations, and genotyping of Cyclospora cayetanensis clusters.

=== Respiratory viruses ===
During the COVID-19 pandemic, MicrobeTrace was used in outbreak investigations in community and institutional settings, including studies of transmission associated with social events and university populations.

=== Other pathogens ===
The platform has also been applied to emerging infectious diseases, including investigations of mpox transmission.

== Availability ==
MicrobeTrace is distributed as open-source software and is available through the CDC's public code repository. It is designed to run in modern web browsers without requiring installation.

== See also ==
- Molecular epidemiology
- Phylogenetics
- Genetic epidemiology
