= Mesquite High School =

Mesquite High School may refer to:

- Mesquite High School (Arizona), a high school in Gilbert, Arizona
- Mesquite High School (Texas), a high school in Mesquite, Texas
