= HYPHY =

Computational phylogenetics software

HyPhy
- Developer(s): Sergei L Kosakovsky Pond, Art FY Poon, Steven Weaver, N. Lance Hepler, Martin Smith.
- Stable release: 2.5.24 / 17 December 2020
- Available in: English
- Type: Computational phylogenetics
- Website: www.hyphy.org

HYPHY (/ˈhaɪfaɪ/ HY-fy) is a free multiplatform (Mac, Windows and UNIX) computational phylogenetics software package intended to perform maximum likelihood analyses of genetic sequence data and equipped with tools to test various statistical hypotheses. The HYPHY name is an abbreviation for "HYpothesis testing using PHYlogenies". As of March 2018, about 2,000 peer-reviewed scientific journal articles cite HYPHY.

== Major features ==
HYPHY supports analysis of nucleotide, protein and codon sequences, using predefined standard models or user-defined models of evolution. The package supports interaction through a graphical user interface as well as a batch language to set up large and complicated analyses and process the results.

HyPhy includes a versatile suite of methods to detect adaptive evolution at individual amino-acid sites and/or lineages, including generalizations of Nielsen-Yang PAML and Suzuki-Gojobori approaches and many others.

== History ==
The development of HyPhy started in 1997, with the first public release in 2000 and the most recent version as of December 2020 being 2.5.

== Software/code availability and license ==
HYPHY is distributed as freeware with source code released under the MIT License. Compiled binaries for Mac OS X and Windows are available for download. The source code is available so that users can compile the HyPhy application on POSIX systems.

A subset of HYPHY methods for detecting adaptive evolution are also made available by the HYPHY team at Temple University on the DataMonkey cluster.
