= NeXML format =

File format for phylogenetics data

NeXML
- Filename extensions: .nexml
- Internet media type: text/x-nexml+xml
- Developed by: Rutger A. Vos, et al.
- Initial release: 1 July 2012 (13 years ago)
- Type of format: bioinformatics
- Extended from: XML
- Open format?: Yes
- Website: nexml.org

NeXML is an exchange standard for representing phyloinformatic data. It was inspired by the widely used Nexus file format but uses XML to produce a more robust format for rich phylogenetic data. Advantages include syntax validation, semantic annotation, and web services. The format is broadly supported and has libraries in many popular programming languages for bioinformatics.

== Key features ==
- XML-based syntax with formal schema validation
- Support for rich, structured metadata
- Semantic annotation using controlled vocabularies and ontologies
- Explicit representation of phylogenetic trees, character matrices, and taxa
- Extensibility without breaking backward compatibility
