= Cécile Ané =

Evolutionary biologist and statistical geneticist

Cécile Ané is an evolutionary biologist, botanist, and statistical geneticist whose research involves the inference of evolutionary trees and the evolution of inherited traits, especially for plant species, as well as the mathematical statistics underlying these methods. Educated in France, she works in the United States as a professor at the University of Wisconsin–Madison, with joint appointments in the departments of botany and statistics.

== Education ==
Ané is a graduate of the École normale supérieure de Lyon. She completed her Ph.D. in mathematics in 2000, at Toulouse III - Paul Sabatier University. Her dissertation, Grandes déviations et inégalités fonctionnelles pour des processus de Markov a temps continu sur un graphe [Large deviations and functional inequalities for continuous-time Markov processes on a graph] concerned probability theory, and was directed by Michel Ledoux.

== Research ==
After completing a doctorate in mathematics, Ané's research interests shifted toward more applied topics in the intersection of biology and statistics, because of their real-world applications including adaptation for climate change. She is part of an international consortium seeking to clarify the evolutionary history of the monocots. Beyond plant evolution, she has also participated in research using the history of coevolution of herpes with humans to confirm the African origin of humans.
