= Fred Foulds =

English cricketer

Personal information
- Full name: Frederick George Foulds
- Born: 23 April 1935 (age 91); Leicester, Leicestershire, England
- Batting: Right-handed

Domestic team information
- Years: Team
- 1952–1956: Leicestershire

Career statistics
| Competition | First-class |
|---|---|
| Matches | 2 |
| Runs scored | 1 |
| Batting average | 0.25 |
| 100s/50s | –/– |
| Top score | 1 |
| Balls bowled | – |
| Wickets | – |
| Bowling average | – |
| 5 wickets in innings | – |
| 10 wickets in match | – |
| Best bowling | – |
| Catches/stumpings | –/– |
- Source: Cricinfo, 29 February 2012

Frederick George Foulds (born 23 April 1935 in Leicester) is an English former cricketer. He was a right-handed batsman.

Foulds made two first-class appearances for Leicestershire against Cambridge University at Fenner's in 1952, and for Sussex at Grace Road in the 1956 County Championship. In four batting innings, he scored just a single run, was dismissed for a duck three times and finished with a batting average of 0.25.
