= Tree-Puzzle =

Computer program

TREE-PUZZLE is a computer program used to construct phylogenetic trees from sequence data by maximum likelihood analysis. Branch lengths can be calculated with and without the molecular clock hypothesis.

The software also implemented likelihood mapping, a method to visualize phylogenetic information in datasets, as well as several tests to assess if the likelihoods of trees are significantly worse than those of other trees.

The program's successor is IQ-TREE.

== See also ==
- Computational phylogenetics
