= BMC Ecology and Evolution =

- Discipline: Evolutionary biology
- Language: English

Publication details
- Former name: BMC Evolutionary Biology
- History: 2001–present
- Publisher: BioMed Central
- Open access: Yes
- License: Creative Commons Attribution
- Impact factor: 3.260 (2020)

Standard abbreviations
- ISO 4: BMC Ecol. Evol.

Indexing
- BMC Ecology and Evolution
- CODEN: BEEMCV
- ISSN: 2730-7182
- OCLC no.: 1237830660
- BMC Evolutionary Biology
- CODEN: BEBMCG
- ISSN: 1471-2148
- OCLC no.: 47657384

Links
- Journal homepage; Online archive

BMC Ecology and Evolution (since January 2021), previously BMC Evolutionary Biology (2001–2020), is a peer-reviewed open access scientific journal covering all fields of evolutionary biology, including phylogenetics and palaeontology. It was established in 2001 and is part of a series of BMC journals published by BioMed Central. It was an early journal to integrate with the Dryad Digital Repository to share supplementary data, and it also organises a yearly image competition to help capture the diversity of the planet's flora and fauna.

== Abstracting and indexing ==
The journal is abstracted and indexed in:

- Index Medicus/MEDLINE/PubMed
- BIOSIS Previews
- Chemical Abstracts Service
- EMBASE
- Scopus
- The Zoological Record
- CAB International
- Science Citation Index
- Current Contents/Agriculture, Biology & Environmental Sciences

According to the Journal Citation Reports, the journal has a 2020 impact factor of 3.260.
