= Nexus file =

File format used in bioinformatics

Nexus format
- Filename extensions: usually .nex or .nxs
- Internet media type: application/octet-stream
- Magic number: '#NEXUS\n'
- Developed by: Maddison DR, Swofford DL, Maddison WP
- Initial release: December 1997 (27 years ago)
- Type of format: bioinformatics
- Open format?: Yes

The extensible NEXUS file format is widely used in phylogenetics, evolutionary biology, and bioinformatics. It stores information about taxa, morphological character states, DNA and protein sequence alignments, distances, and phylogenetic trees. The NEXUS format also allows the storage of data that can facilitate analyses, such as sets of characters or taxa. Many popular phylogenetic programs, including PAUP*, MrBayes, Mesquite, MacClade, and SplitsTree, use this format. Nexus file names typically have the extension .nxs or .nex .

== Syntax ==
A NEXUS file is made out of a fixed header #NEXUS followed by multiple blocks. Each block starts with BEGIN block_name; and ends with END;. The keywords are case-insensitive. Comments are enclosed inside square brackets [...]. Each of the pre-defined types of blocks may appear only once.

Block Name	Description
TAXA	Specifies the OTUs (operational taxonomic units) in data set
CHARACTERS	Specifies the character data (e.g., homologous morphological characters or a multiple sequence alignment)
DATA	Equivalent to a CHARACTERS block that includes the NewTaxa subcommand in the Dimensions command
TREES	Stores trees in Newick format
DISTANCES	Stores distance matrices
SETS	Assigns names to sets of characters (CHARSET) or OTUs (TAXSET)
ASSUMPTIONS	Assumptions about the data or directions regarding data treatment (e.g., the character exclusion status)

The following example NEXUS uses the TAXA, CHARACTERS, and TREES blocks:

#NEXUS
Begin TAXA;
  Dimensions ntax=4;
  TaxLabels Alpha Beta Gamma Delta;
End;

Begin CHARACTERS;
  Dimensions nchar=15;
  Format datatype=dna missing=? gap=- matchchar=.;
  Matrix
[ When a position is a "matchchar", it means that it is the same as the first entry at the same position. ]
    Alpha   atgctagctagctcg
    Beta    ......??...-.a.
    Gamma   ...t.......-.g. [ same as atgttagctag-tgg ]
    Delta   ...t.......-.a.           
  ;
End;

Begin TREES;
  Tree tree1 = ((Alpha,Beta),Gamma,Delta);
END;

== See also ==
- Newick format
- NeXML format
- phyloXML
