= PAUP* =

Computational phylogenetics program

Phylogenetic Analysis Using Parsimony *and other methods
- Original author: David L. Swofford
- Stable release: 4.0b10
- Preview release: 4.0a164
- Written in: C
- Operating system: Windows, macOS, Unix-like
- Platform: Cross-platform
- Type: Science
- License: Quasi-commercial
- Website: PAUP*

PAUP* (Phylogenetic Analysis Using Parsimony *and other methods) is a computational phylogenetics program for inferring evolutionary trees (phylogenies), written by David L. Swofford. Originally, as the name implies, PAUP only implemented parsimony, but from version 4.0 (when the program became known as PAUP*) it also supports distance matrix and likelihood methods. Version 3.0 ran on Macintosh computers and supported a rich, user-friendly graphical interface. Together with the program MacClade, with which it shares the NEXUS data format, PAUP* was the phylogenetic software of choice for many phylogenetists.

Version 4.0 added support for Windows (graphical shell and command line) and Unix (command line only) platforms. However, the graphical user interface for the Macintosh does not support versions of Mac OS X higher than 10.14 (although a GUI for later versions of Mac OS is planned). PAUP* is also available as a plugin for Geneious. PAUP*, which now sports the self-referential title of PAUP* (* Phylogenetic Analysis Using PAUP), is undergoing rapid updates and it now includes the "species tree" method SVDquartets, in addition to parsimony, likelihood, and distance methods for phylogenetics.
