= K80 =

K80 or K-80 may refer to:

- K-80 (Kansas highway), a state highway in Kansas

== See also ==
- Substitution model
