= Christina Curtis =

American cancer biologist

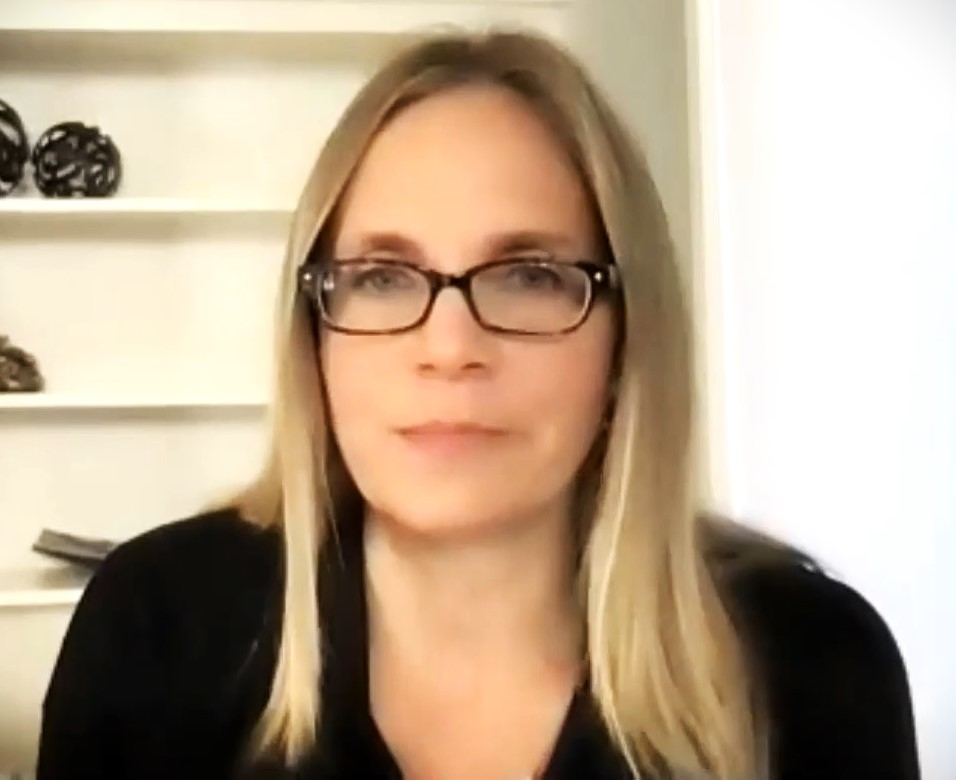
- Curtis in 2021
- Education: University of California, Los Angeles (BS); Heidelberg University (MSc); University of Southern California (MS, PhD)
- Scientific career
- Fields: Cancer genomics Tumor evolution Computational biology Early detection
- Workplaces: Stanford University; University of Cambridge
- Thesis: Analysis of high-density oligonucleotide gene expression data for dissecting aging pathways (2007)
- Doctoral advisor: Simon Tavaré
- Website: profiles.stanford.edu/christina-curtis

Christina Curtis is an American cancer biologist who is a Professor of Medicine, Genetics and Biomedical Data Science at Stanford University where her research focuses on tumor genetics and evolution. She is director of Artificial Intelligence and Cancer Genomics at the Stanford University School of Medicine and is on the board of directors of the American Association for Cancer Research.

== Early life and education ==
Curtis decided that she wanted to work on cancer treatments when she was a teenager. She was an undergraduate student at the University of California, Los Angeles studying cellular and molecular biology and did a masters degree at Heidelberg University. She moved to the University of Southern California for graduate studies, where she earned both a master's and a doctoral degree. She completed her PhD in molecular and computational biology in 2007 supervised by Simon Tavaré.

== Research and career ==
Curtis was a postdoctoral researcher at the University of Cambridge, where she spent three years before returning to the faculty at the University of Southern California.

Curtis has leveraged computational modeling to better understand breast cancer, providing insight into the evolution and metastasization of tumors. She established the Cancer Computational and Systems Biology group.

Curtis uses computer simulations to understand genetic mutations in tumor samples. She believes that breast cancer tumors have genetic differences that respond differently to treatments. In 2019, she combined molecular analysis and historical clinical data to create the largest breast cancer cohort. In this cohort she found four groups of tumors that occur later in life, up to 20 years after the initial cancer diagnosis. She also found a subset of breast cancer tumors that do not recur after five years. To this end, Curtis believes that tumors with metastatic potential have this from the start – they are "born to be bad".

In 2022, Curtis was appointed director of Artificial Intelligence and Cancer Genomics at the Stanford Cancer Institute.

=== Awards and honors ===
- 2011 Breast Cancer Research Foundation The Ulta Beauty Award
- 2012 V Scholar Grant
- 2016 Kavli Foundation Frontiers of Science Fellow
- 2018 National Institutes of Health Director's Pioneer Award
- 2020 Susan G. Komen Scholar
- 2022 American Association for Cancer Research Award for Outstanding Achievement in Basic Science
- 2025 Paul Marks Prize for Cancer Research

=== Selected publications ===
- Curtis, Christina; Sohrab P. Shah; Suet-Feung Chin; et al. (2012). "The genomic and transcriptomic architecture of 2,000 breast tumours reveals novel subgroups" (PDF). Nature. 486 (7403): 346–52. doi:10.1038/nature10983. PMC 3440846. PMID 22522925. Wikidata Q29614700.
- Jae-Ho Cheong (2014). "Comprehensive molecular characterization of gastric adenocarcinoma". Nature. 513 (7517): 202–9. doi:10.1038/nature13480. PMC 4170219. PMID 25079317. Wikidata Q28244985.
- Andrea Sottoriva; Haeyoun Kang; Zhicheng Ma; et al. (2015). "A Big Bang model of human colorectal tumor growth". Nature Genetics. 47 (3): 209–216. doi:10.1038/ng.3214. PMC 4575589. PMID 25665006. Wikidata Q36074227.
