= Simon Tavaré =

British cancer researcher (born 1952)

Simon Tavaré FRS FMedSci
- Born: 13 May 1952 (age 74)
- Education: Oundle School
- Alma mater: University of Sheffield
- Awards: Royal Society Wolfson Research Merit Award (2003–2009); Member of the National Academy of Sciences (2018)
- Scientific career
- Fields: Statistics; Genomics; Computational biology
- Institutions: Columbia University; University of Cambridge; University of Southern California
- Thesis: Some results for Markow processes with application to genetic models.
- Doctoral students: Christina Curtis
- Other notable students: Rebecca Doerge; Tandy Warnow (postdoc)
- Website: www.damtp.cam.ac.uk/person/st321

Simon Tavaré (born 1952) is a British researcher who is the founding Director of the Herbert and Florence Irving Institute of Cancer Dynamics at Columbia University. Prior to joining Columbia, he was Director of the Cancer Research UK Cambridge Institute, Professor of Cancer Research at the Department of Oncology and Professor in the Department of Applied Mathematics and Theoretical Physics (DAMTP) at the University of Cambridge.

== Education ==
Tavaré was educated at Oundle School and the University of Sheffield where he was awarded a Bachelor of Science degree in 1974, a Master of Science degree in 1975, and a PhD in 1979.

== Research and career ==
Tavaré is a computational biologist and statistician, with his research focusing on three main areas: statistical methods for the analysis of next‑generation sequencing data, evolutionary approaches to cancer and methods for the analysis of genomics data.

Tavaré's research has been funded by Cancer Research UK, the Royal Society, the European Union, Horizon 2020, the Wellcome Trust, the Biotechnology and Biological Sciences Research Council (BBSRC), the Engineering and Physical Sciences Research Council (EPSRC), the Medical Research Council (MRC) and the National Institutes of Health (NIH). His former students include Christina Curtis.

=== Awards and honours ===
Tavaré was elected a Fellow of the Royal Society (FRS) in 2011 and a Fellow of the Academy of Medical Sciences (FMedSci) in 2009. He held a Royal Society Wolfson Research Merit Award from 2003 to 2009. In 2018, Tavare was elected a Fellow of the American Mathematical Society and a Foreign Associate of the National Academy of Sciences. In 2020 he was elected an Honorary Fellow of Christ's College, Cambridge, the College of which he had been a Fellow while a professor at Cambridge between 2004 and 2019. In the June 2023 Graduation Ceremonies at University of St Andrews, Tavaré was awarded Doctor of Science (DSc), in recognition of his major contribution to computational biology, statistics, and the study of cancer.
