= Transition (genetics) =

DNA mutation that exchanges two nucleotides

Illustration of a transition: each of the 4 nucleotide changes between purines or between pyrimidines (in blue). The 8 other changes are transversions (in red).

Transition, in genetics and molecular biology, refers to a point mutation that changes a purine nucleotide to another purine (A ↔ G) or a pyrimidine nucleotide to another pyrimidine (C ↔ T). Transitions are common in genomes; approximately two out of three single nucleotide polymorphisms (SNPs) are transitions.

== Molecular basis ==
Transitions can be caused by several mechanisms, including spontaneous deamination and tautomerization. Deamination of cytosine produces uracil while deamination of 5-methylcytosine produces thymine. Rare tautomeric forms of DNA bases can also mispair during replication without major distortion of the double helix. If these base changes and mismatches escape DNA repair mechanisms, they can become fixed as transition mutations.

== Transition bias ==
Although there are twice as many possible transversions, transitions occur more often in genomes, a pattern known as transition/transversion bias. This bias results mainly from molecular structure and selection pressure. In coding regions, transitions are more likely than transversions to produce synonymous substitutions. Also, transitions are less likely than transversions to cause drastic amino acid changes because of the structure of the genetic code. Moreover, some transition-generating base-pair mismatches may cause less distortion to the DNA double helix which may therefore escape repair mechanisms.

== CpG sites and methylation ==
In vertebrate genomes, spontaneous deamination of 5-methylcytosine creates T:G mismatches that become fixed as C→T transitions. As a result, methylated CpG dinucleotides are important hotspots for transition mutations. This mechanism contributes to the genome-wide depletion of CpG dinucleotides over evolutionary time. However, CpG islands are an exception because they are often unmethylated and therefore less affected by this mutational process.

- Transversion
