= Transversion =

DNA mutation

Illustration of a transversion: each of the 8 nucleotide changes between a purine and a pyrimidine (in red). The 4 other changes are transitions (in blue).

Transversion, in molecular biology, refers to a point mutation in DNA in which a single (two ring) purine (A or G) is changed for a (one ring) pyrimidine (T or C), or vice versa. A transversion can be spontaneous, or it can be caused by ionizing radiation or alkylating agents. It can only be reversed by a spontaneous reversion.

== Ratio of transitions to transversions ==
Although there are two possible transversions but only one possible transition per base, transition mutations are more likely than transversions because substituting a single ring structure for another single ring structure is more likely than substituting a double ring for a single ring. Also, transitions are less likely to result in amino acid substitutions (due to wobble base pair), and are therefore more likely to persist as "silent substitutions" in populations as single nucleotide polymorphisms (SNPs). A transversion usually has a more pronounced effect than a transition because the second and third nucleotide codon position of the DNA, which to a large extent is responsible for the degeneracy of the code, is more tolerant of transition than a transversion: transitions are more likely to be synonymous substitutions than transversions, as one observes in the codon table.

== Spontaneous germline transversion ==
8-oxo-2'-deoxyguanosine (8-oxodG) is an oxidized derivative of deoxyguanosine, and is one of the major products of DNA oxidation. During DNA replication in the germ line of mice, the oxidized base 8-oxoguanine (8-oxoG) causes spontaneous and heritable G to T transversion mutations. These mutations occur in different stages of the germ cell lineage and are distributed throughout the chromosomes.

== Consequences of transversion mutations ==
The location of a transversion mutation on a gene coding for a protein correlates with the extent of the mutation. If the mutation occurs at a site that is not involved with the shape of a protein or the structure of an enzyme or its active site, the mutation will not have a significant effect on the cell or the enzymatic activity of its proteins. If the mutation occurs at a site that changes the structure or function of a protein, therefore changing its enzymatic activity, the mutation can have significant effects on the survival of the cell.

== Transversions due to products of oxidative guanine damage ==
Of the natural nitrogenous bases of DNA, guanine is most prone to oxidation. Oxidation of guanine, also known as oxidative guanine damage, results in the formation of many products. These products trigger mutations, leading to DNA damage, and can pair with adenine and guanine through hydrogen bonding causing G-T transversions and G-C transversions, respectively.

== Transversion and p53 mutations in smoking-associated cancers ==
The mutation of the P53 gene is the most common gene mutation found in cancer cells. A study has shown that p53 mutations are common in tobacco-related cancers, with a variation in the amount of G-T transversions in lung cancer from smokers and non-smokers. In smokers’ lung cancer, the prevalence of G-T transversions is 30% compared to that of 12% in non-smokers. At many p53 mutational hotspots, a large number of the mutations are G-T events in lung cancers but almost exclusively G-A transitions in non-tobacco-related cancers.

== See also ==
- Transition
- Aristolochic acid, a natural plant chemical causing A → T and T → A transversions in humans
- P53
- Guanine
- DNA oxidation
- Oxidative stress
