= TTS =

TTS may refer to:

== Places ==
- Taman Tasik Semenyih, Kuala Lumpur, Malaysia, a student town
- Toba Tek Singh District, a district in the Punjab province of Pakistan
- Toba Tek Singh Tehsil
- Toba Tek Singh, Punjab, Pakistan

== Schools ==
- Tamil Nadu Theological Seminary
- Tanglin Trust School, Singapore
- Thomas Telford School, a City Technology College in Telford, Shropshire

== Science ==
=== Medicine ===
- Temporary threshold shift, auditory fatigue
- Tarsal tunnel syndrome, a foot condition
- Transdermal therapeutic system, a drug delivery system
- Thrombosis with thrombocytopenia syndrome, a rare condition of blood clotting
- Takotsubo syndrome, a heart condition, also known as takotsubo cardiomyopathy

=== Other uses in science ===
- T Tauri star, in astronomy
- Three-taxon analysis, in phylogenetics
- Time-temperature superposition, in polymer physics
- Time translation symmetry, invariabilty of the laws of physics

== Technology ==
- Text-to-speech, in speech synthesis
- Teletypesetter, in telegraphy
- Transaction Tracking System, on the Novell NetWare OS
- Technology Transformation Services, of the US General Services Administration

== Transport ==
- Audi TTS, a car
- Tower Transit Singapore, a bus operator
- Tanker Transport Services BV, a Dutch barge tanker company

== Other uses ==
- Girls' Generation-TTS, a South Korean music subgroup
- Telegraphic transfer, a selling rate in Japan
- Tabletop Simulator, a video game emulating board games
- Trader tax status, a form of US business for securities trading
