= TBR =

TBR may refer to:

- Tampa Bay Rays, a Major League Baseball team
- Tampa Bay Rowdies, a USL Championship soccer club
- Tree bisection and reconnection, a tree rearrangement algorithm in computational phylogenetics
- TBR, IATA code for Statesboro-Bulloch County Airport
- TBR1 (T-box, brain, 1), a transcription factor protein
- Teenage Bottlerocket, a punk rock band from Laramie, Wyoming
- Tennessee Board of Regents, a public university system
- This Beautiful Republic, a Christian rock band from Toledo, Ohio
- Tick-borne rickettsiosis
- Tile-based rendering
- Tommy Baldwin Racing, a NASCAR race team
- Torpedo bomber reconnaissance
- Tracheobronchial rupture, a type of tracheobronchial injury
- Tracy Beaker Returns, a 2010 CBBC show
- Trickle-bed reactor, a chemical reactor
- The Barnes Review, American far-right magazine
