= Stratocladistics =

Stratocladistics is a technique in phylogenetics of making phylogenetic inferences using both geological and morphobiological data. It follows many of the same rules as cladistics, using Bayesian logic to quantify how good a phylogenetic hypothesis is in terms of debt and parsimony. However, in addition to the morphological debt that is used to determine phylogenetic dissimilarities in cladistics, there is also stratigraphic debt which adds the dimension of time to the equation. Although stratocladistics has been viewed with suspicion by some workers, it represents a total evidence approach that has some advantages over traditional cladistic approaches. For example, stratocladistics has been shown to outperform simple parsimony in tests based on simulated data and stratocladistics has better resolution than simple cladistics, with fewer equally parsimonious trees than in a basic cladistic analysis.
