= Distance matrices in phylogeny =

Matrices used in construction of phylogenetic trees

Distance matrices are used in phylogeny as non-parametric distance methods and were originally applied to phenetic data using a matrix of pairwise distances. These distances are then reconciled to produce a tree (a phylogram, with informative branch lengths). The distance matrix can come from a number of different sources, including measured distance (for example from immunological studies) or morphometric analysis, various pairwise distance formulae (such as euclidean distance) applied to discrete morphological characters, or genetic distance from sequence, restriction fragment, or allozyme data. For phylogenetic character data, raw distance values can be calculated by simply counting the number of pairwise differences in character states (Hamming distance).

== Distance-matrix methods ==
Distance-matrix methods of phylogenetic analysis explicitly rely on a measure of "genetic distance" between the sequences being classified, and therefore they start with a multiple sequence alignment (MSA) as an input. From it, they construct an all-to-all matrix describing the distance between each sequence pair. Finally, they construct a phylogenetic tree that places closely related sequences under the same interior node and whose branch lengths closely reproduce the observed distances between sequences. The produced tree is either rooted or unrooted, depending on the algorithm used.

Distance is often defined as the fraction of mismatches at aligned positions, with gaps either ignored or counted as mismatches.

Distance-matrix methods are frequently used as the basis for progressive and iterative types of multiple sequence alignment.

The main disadvantage of distance-matrix methods is their inability to efficiently use information about local high-variation regions that appear across multiple subtrees.

=== Neighbor-joining ===
Neighbor-joining methods apply general data clustering techniques to sequence analysis using genetic distance as a clustering metric. The simple neighbor-joining method produces unrooted trees, but it does not assume a constant rate of evolution (i.e., a molecular clock) across lineages.

=== UPGMA and WPGMA ===
The UPGMA (Unweighted Pair Group Method with Arithmetic mean) and WPGMA (Weighted Pair Group Method with Arithmetic mean) methods produce rooted trees and require a constant-rate assumption – that is, it assumes an ultrametric tree in which the distances from the root to every branch tip are equal.

=== Fitch–Margoliash method ===
The Fitch–Margoliash method uses a weighted least squares method for clustering based on genetic distance. Closely related sequences are given more weight in the tree construction process to correct for the increased inaccuracy in measuring distances between distantly related sequences. In practice, the distance correction is only necessary when the evolution rates differ among branches. The distances used as input to the algorithm must be normalized to prevent large artifacts in computing relationships between closely related and distantly related groups. The distances calculated by this method must be linear; the linearity criterion for distances requires that the expected values of the branch lengths for two individual branches must equal the expected value of the sum of the two branch distances – a property that applies to biological sequences only when they have been corrected for the possibility of back mutations at individual sites. This correction is done through the use of a substitution matrix such as that derived from the Jukes–Cantor model of DNA evolution.

The least-squares criterion applied to these distances is more accurate but less efficient than the neighbor-joining methods. An additional improvement that corrects for correlations between distances that arise from many closely related sequences in the data set can also be applied at increased computational cost. Finding the optimal least-squares tree with any correction factor is NP-complete, so heuristic search methods like those used in maximum-parsimony analysis are applied to the search through tree space.

=== Using outgroups ===
Independent information about the relationship between sequences or groups can be used to help reduce the tree search space and root unrooted trees. Standard usage of distance-matrix methods involves the inclusion of at least one outgroup sequence known to be only distantly related to the sequences of interest in the query set. This usage can be seen as a type of experimental control. If the outgroup has been appropriately chosen, it will have a much greater genetic distance and thus a longer branch length than any other sequence, and it will appear near the root of a rooted tree. Choosing an appropriate outgroup requires the selection of a sequence that is moderately related to the sequences of interest; too close a relationship defeats the purpose of the outgroup and too distant adds noise to the analysis. Care should also be taken to avoid situations in which the species from which the sequences were taken are distantly related, but the gene encoded by the sequences is highly conserved across lineages. Horizontal gene transfer, especially between otherwise divergent bacteria, can also confound outgroup usage.

=== Weaknesses of different methods ===
In general, pairwise distance data are an underestimate of the path-distance between taxa on a phylogram. Pairwise distances effectively "cut corners" in a manner analogous to geographic distance: the distance between two cities may be 100 miles "as the crow flies," but a traveler may actually be obligated to travel 120 miles because of the layout of roads, the terrain, stops along the way, etc. Between pairs of taxa, some character changes that took place in ancestral lineages will be undetectable, because later changes have erased the evidence (often called multiple hits and back mutations in sequence data). This problem is common to all phylogenetic estimation, but it is particularly acute for distance methods, because only two samples are used for each distance calculation; other methods benefit from evidence of these hidden changes found in other taxa not considered in pairwise comparisons. For nucleotide and amino acid sequence data, the same stochastic models of nucleotide change used in maximum likelihood analysis can be employed to "correct" distances, rendering the analysis "semi-parametric."

Several simple algorithms exist to construct a tree directly from pairwise distances, including UPGMA and neighbor joining (NJ), but these will not necessarily produce the best tree for the data. To counter potential complications noted above, and to find the best tree for the data, distance analysis can also incorporate a tree-search protocol that seeks to satisfy an explicit optimality criterion. Two optimality criteria are commonly applied to distance data, minimum evolution (ME) and least squares inference. Least squares is part of a broader class of regression-based methods lumped together here for simplicity. These regression formulae minimize the residual differences between path-distances along the tree and pairwise distances in the data matrix, effectively "fitting" the tree to the empirical distances. In contrast, ME accepts the tree with the shortest sum of branch lengths, and thus minimizes the total amount of evolution assumed. ME is closely akin to parsimony, and under certain conditions, ME analysis of distances based on a discrete character dataset will favor the same tree as conventional parsimony analysis of the same data.

Phylogeny estimation using distance methods has produced a number of controversies. UPGMA assumes an ultrametric tree (a tree where all the path-lengths from the root to the tips are equal). If the rate of evolution were equal in all sampled lineages (a molecular clock), and if the tree were completely balanced (equal numbers of taxa on both sides of any split, to counter the node density effect), UPGMA should not produce a biased result. These expectations are not met by most datasets, and although UPGMA is somewhat robust to their violation, it is not commonly used for phylogeny estimation. The advantage of UPGMA is that it is fast and can handle many sequences.

Neighbor-joining is a form of star decomposition and, as a heuristic method, is generally the least computationally intensive of these methods. It is very often used on its own, and in fact quite frequently produces reasonable trees. However, it lacks any sort of tree search and optimality criterion, and so there is no guarantee that the recovered tree is the one that best fits the data. A more appropriate analytical procedure would be to use NJ to produce a starting tree, then employ a tree search using an optimality criterion, to ensure that the best tree is recovered.

Many scientists eschew distance methods, for various reasons. A commonly cited reason is that distances are inherently phenetic rather than phylogenetic, in that they do not distinguish between ancestral similarity (symplesiomorphy) and derived similarity (synapomorphy). This criticism is not entirely fair: most currently implementations of parsimony, likelihood, and Bayesian phylogenetic inference use time-reversible character models, and thus accord no special status to derived or ancestral character states. Under these models, the tree is estimated unrooted; rooting, and consequently determination of polarity, is performed after the analysis. The primary difference between these methods and distances is that parsimony, likelihood, and Bayesian methods fit individual characters to the tree, whereas distance methods fit all the characters at once. There is nothing inherently less phylogenetic about this approach.

More practically, distance methods are avoided because the relationship between individual characters and the tree is lost in the process of reducing characters to distances. These methods do not use character data directly, and information locked in the distribution of character states can be lost in the pairwise comparisons. Also, some complex phylogenetic relationships may produce biased distances. On any phylogram, branch lengths will be underestimated because some changes cannot be discovered at all due to failure to sample some species due to either experimental design or extinction (a phenomenon called the node density effect). However, even if pairwise distances from genetic data are "corrected" using stochastic models of evolution as mentioned above, they may more easily sum to a different tree than one produced from analysis of the same data and model using maximum likelihood. This is because pairwise distances are not independent; each branch on a tree is represented in the distance measurements of all taxa it separates. Error resulting from any characteristic of that branch that might confound phylogeny (stochastic variability, change in evolutionary parameters, an abnormally long or short branch length) will be propagated through all of the relevant distance measurements. The resulting distance matrix may then better fit an alternate (presumably less optimal) tree.

Despite these potential problems, distance methods are extremely fast, and they often produce a reasonable estimate of phylogeny. They also have certain benefits over the methods that use characters directly. Notably, distance methods allow use of data that may not be easily converted to character data, such as DNA–DNA hybridization assays. They also permit analyses that account for the possibility that the rate at which particular nucleotides are incorporated into sequences may vary over the tree, using LogDet distances. For some network-estimation methods (notably NeighborNet), the abstraction of information about individual characters in distance data are an advantage. When considered character-by character, conflict between character and a tree due to reticulation cannot be told from conflict due either to homoplasy or error. However, pronounced conflict in distance data, which represents an amalgamation of many characters, is less likely due to error or homoplasy unless the data are strongly biased, and is thus more likely to be a result of reticulation.

Distance methods are popular among molecular systematists, a substantial number of whom use NJ without an optimization stage almost exclusively. With the increasing speed of character-based analyses, some of the advantages of distance methods will probably wane. However, the nearly instantaneous NJ implementations, the ability to incorporate an evolutionary model in a speedy analysis, LogDet distances, network estimation methods, and the occasional need to summarize relationships with a single number all mean that distance methods will probably stay in the mainstream for a long time to come.

== See also ==
- List of phylogenetics software
