= Patrocladogram =

A patrocladogram is a cladistic branching pattern that has been precisely modified by use of patristic distances (i.e., divergences between lineages); a type of phylogram. The patristic distance is defined as, "the number of apomorphic step changes separating two taxa on a cladogram," and is used exclusively to determine the amount of divergence of a characteristic from a common ancestor. This means that cladistic and patristic distances are combined to construct a new tree using various phenetic algorithms. The purpose of the patrocladogram in biological classification is to form a hypothesis about which evolutionary processes are actually involved before making a taxonomic decision. Patrocladograms are based on biostatistics that include but are not limited to: parsimony, distance matrix, likelihood methods, and Bayesian probability. Some examples of genomically related data that can be used as inputs for these methods are: molecular sequences, whole genome sequences, gene frequencies, restriction sites, distance matrices, unique characters, mutations such as SNPs, and mitochondrial genome data.

== Cautions with patrocladogram usage ==
Patrocladograms are graphs that assert hypotheses of similarity whereas phylogenetic trees are graphs that assert hypotheses of common ancestry. When a patrocladogram does not logically match with a comparable phylogenetic tree hypothesis it should not be used to define monophyletic groups. The usage of patrocladograms can skew interpretations of novel evolution or depict homologous traits as homoplastic.

== Programs for patrocladogram analysis ==
Most phylograms are saved in some variant of the Newick format such as: PAUP*, MEGA, Molecular Evolutionary Genetics Analysis, Clustal, PHYLIP, or Nexus file. These various versions of the Newick format can then be used as an input for patristic distances in patrocladogram formation. There are two widely used pieces of software; one is used for analyzing patristic distance, and the other for creating a viewable patrocladogram.

See both programs below:

=== PATRISTIC ===
Patristic is a Java program that uses different tree files as input and computes their patristic distances. Patristic allows saving and editing those distances. Patristic provides different graphic views of the results as well as the possibility to save them in the CSV format for building graphics using Excel.

=== RAMI ===
RAMI uses branch lengths to create clusters which can then be visualized as a patrocladogram.
