= Taman Tasik Semenyih =

Taman Tasik Semenyih Semenyih Lake Park
- Interactive map of Taman Tasik Semenyih
- Coordinates: 2°56′56″N 101°52′15″E
- Country: Malaysia
- State: Selangor

Government
  - Administered by: Majlis Perbandaran Kajang (Kajang Municipal Council)

Area
  - Total: 3 km^{2} (1.2 sq mi)
- Elevation: 55 m (180 ft)

Population (2010)
  - Total: 2,100
  - Density: 700/km^{2} (1,800/sq mi)
- Time zone: UTC+8 (MST)
  - Summer (DST): Not observed
- Website: http://www.btslandcapital.com/

Taman Tasik Semenyih (often abbreviated as TTS by students) or less commonly known as Semenyih Lake Park is a university town adjacent to the University of Nottingham Malaysia Campus located in Selangor, Malaysia.

Houses in this neighbourhood are typically owned by a few landlords who then rent out houses to students. Rents are comparatively higher than those of the general area. Most rentable homes are dilapidated, furnished poorly and usually suffering from animal infestation.

Due to the developing state of the campus and general area, basic services are poor at best. Fiber internet is not available in this area, and cellphone reception is very poor. However, as of the year 2016 TELEKOM MALAYSIA is now operating the fiber internet and mobile services is now available.

== History ==
Originally Taman Tasik Semenyih was developed by a low profile Malaysian developer, Bandar Tasik Semenyih Sdn Bhd or BTS Land Capital, as an out of town, low density residential development meant for low to middle income people who work in Klang Valley. In the beginning, the town failed to grow as originally envisioned, with most of the residential and commercial lots undeveloped. However, following the inception and opening of the adjacent university campus, the town has shifted in role and now prominently houses students from the university in the form of off-campus accommodation. Commercial activity is slowly increasing albeit at a very slow rate with much of the commercial area still devoid of any activity. Most of the area is made up of low density residential housing with pockets of medium-density housing.

In the early 2010s, with the boom of short-term student housing, numerous houses are being converted into student hostels. Typically a three bed room landed house is expanded upon and made into 8-10 room hostel. This has raised the issue of added congestion, noise pollution and general health and safety risk. There is also general worry that sewage lines within the estate may not be able to cope with the increasing amounts of solid waste being made. However, since 2016 Indah Water Sewerage treatment plant located along Jalan TTS1/1 has been upgraded and extended to cope with new developments in the area.

== Geography ==
There is a small commercial area located to the south of the town. Due to a lack of economic activity and patronage, most of the shops are closed and the area can be classified as a ghost town. A small drain runs along the major arterial road of this town. With the rise in student population, more restaurants have started appearing along this commercial area, particularly to the shophouses located adjacent to the main roads. Restaurants are typically offering middle eastern, south Asian or local cuisine, with most of the international ones offering delivery service. Food prices are typically higher than average.

Taman Tasik Semenyih can be further classified into 7 zones:

=== Taman Tasik Semenyih 1 ===
An intended high income area, of bungalow land lots surrounding a man-made lake. This area comprises 52 bungalow lots ranging from 12,000 sq ft and above. This is the zone with one family club house with a cafeteria open to public, a 20-acre public lake garden and a golf driving range.

==== TTS Tetris Apartments ====
A premium 3 block of 4-storey walk up apartments are located within this area. Designed and built for University of Nottingham Malaysia off-campus students.

This area is served frequently by a handful of buses and taxis from the university.

=== Taman Tasik Semenyih 2 ===
Lower-medium cost terrace houses fill this small area, a number of houses of this area has been converted to student housing, due to the dense nature of hostel occupancy, parking shortage is an increasing problem.

=== Taman Tasik Semenyih 3 ===
- Bungalow lots typically filled with single storey bungalows. Some of these bungalows have been renovated and expanded into 2 storey dwellings and some into student hostels. There at least 5 fraternity and sorority houses located within the area. One of them, dubbed the "white house" was a former church converted into a hostel. However, since Sept 2013, the "white house" was closed. This was due to the widespread cases of theft and break-ins that were occurring within the area.

=== Taman Tasik Semenyih 4 ===
- A mixture of bungalow houses and semi-detached houses, generally student populated and very noisy at night. The deeper parts of this zone is gated. Being a middle income area, this area features, a sizable park, a surau (small prayer hall), and is often promoted as a wifi precinct.

=== Taman Tasik Semenyih 5 ===
- The zone of nearest access to campus due to presence of pedestrian bridge. Typically terrace house with lines of 2 storey bungalows, due to location, one of the popular, and highly inflated rent areas. Houses near to the bridge has been openly converted to private student hostels. A converted house in this area tend to have 10-24 beds. Due to the noisy, raucous behaviour of students and the chance to cash in on student rentals there has been a mass exodus of family homes, with estimates of 39.4% homes currently lived by families. While student population over the academic year making up an excess of 62.1% of the living population.

==== TTS EDU Square ====
EDU Square is a collective of semi detached and interlinked terrace buildings, purpose built as student hostels. These were built by BTS Land Capital. Some of these are managed by varying parties. Rent here is comparatively expensive compared to regular TTS accommodation, but is typically viewed as being safer due to the use of permanent private security personnel on-site. Though crime index seems to suggest otherwise.

=== Taman Tasik Semenyih 6 ===
- Low cost terrace area. Unlike the other areas this area, this area is not popular with students and family home still account for 83.4% of the houses. Predominantly a Malay area, this area is made up of low-income residents, ethnic Malay students and staff.

=== Taman Tasik Semenyih 7 ===
- The newest area with upper-medium cost semi detached houses, with inflated rent that is comparable to those in TTS 5. This zone is located at the deep end of the arterial road and is generally opinion-ed as being situated too far from campus. Unlike other areas, which have vestiges of non-student residence. TTS 7 is fully occupied by students. Houses here, are typically rented in sets of whole units, though single rooms are also available.

== Geography and climate ==
The temperature generally ranges from 30 °C to 34 °C during the day and 25 °C to 28 °C during the night, with cooler temperatures during and after a heavy rainfall. The humidity level is at 80% throughout the year. As such, air conditioning is widely used, causing ambient temperatures within this area to rise above the normal average.

As with other places in Malaysia, Taman Tasik Semenyih is in the tropical rainforest climate where there are minimal changes in seasons, however from May till September and January till early March the campus faces a dry season and from mid-November till December a mild wet season. Due to these changes, the changing colours of leaves and the flowering of certain plants may be observed. In late March a tropical variation of cherry blossom may be observed on certain trees from following the dry season.

== Transportation ==
Taman Tasik Semenyih being a student town has a number of university operated bus services serving the area. The main one is the UNMC-Kajang Shuttle bus service, an hourly bus service. This service is supported by a Semenyih shuttle bus, which provides frequent bus service to this area at certain times of day. Aside from this, this area is also served by the return leg of UNMC-Tesco shuttle services.

Similar to most outlying townships in the Klang valley area, this area is not served by any public bus service. Previously, in 2004-2005 a RapidKL service was available but due to poor ridership. The bus route was retracted.

Pedestrian sidewalks in Taman Tasik Semenyih are virtually non-existent. Pedestrians are typically expected to share the available road space with vehicles, or walk on grass land.
