= Olivier Gascuel =

French researcher

Olivier Gascuel (born 1956) is a French researcher in bioinformatics. He is a research director at the CNRS. His work focuses in particular on phylogeny. He was the director of the Centre for Bioinformatics, Biostatistics and Integrative Biology at the Pasteur Institute from 2015 till 2020. In 2021, he joined the Institute of Systematics, Evolution, Biodiversity (ISYEB) at the National Museum of Natural History, France.

== Biography ==
In 1975, Olivier Gascuel joined the École normale supérieure de Cachan, where he studied mathematics and then specialized in computer science. In parallel, he studied architecture.

In 1981, he defended a doctoral thesis on expert systems for medical diagnosis, then joined the CNRS as a research fellow.

He joined the Montpellier Laboratory of Computer Science, Robotics and Microelectronics (LIRMM) in 1987, and since then has focused his research on phylogeny. More recently, he has oriented part of his activities towards pathogens.

In 2000, together with Marie-France Sagot, he initiated the annual JOBIM conference, the "Journées Ouvertes en Biologie, Informatique et Mathématiques" (Open Days in Biology, Informatics and Mathematics), now organized by the French Society of Bioinformatics (SFBI).

== Awards ==
- In 2009, Olivier Gascuel was awarded the CNRS silver medal.
- In 2017, he is the winner of the Grand Prix Inria - Académie des sciences.
- Member of the French Academy of sciences in the integrative biology section, since 2019.

== Books ==
- Sylvie Thiria, Olivier Gascuel and Yves Lechevallier, Statistique et méthodes neuronales, Éditions Dunod, 1997, 311 p. (ISBN 9782100035441).
- (en) Olivier Gascuel, Mathematics of Evolution and Phylogeny, Oxford University Press, 2005, 416 p. (ISBN 9780198566106).
