= Andrey Rzhetsky =

Kazakhstan-born human geneticist

- Education: Novosibirsk State University; Institute of Cytology and Genetics
- Scientific career
- Fields: Computational biology; Medical genetics
- Workplaces: Columbia University; University of Chicago
- Academic advisors: Masatoshi Nei

Andrey Rzhetsky is the Edna K. Papazian Professor of Medicine and Professor of Human Genetics at the University of Chicago, where he is also Co-Chief of the Section of Computational Biomedicine and Biomedical Data Science. Born in Kazakhstan, Rzhetsky was recruited to Pennsylvania State University (Penn State) by Masatoshi Nei in 1991 from the Institute of Cytology and Genetics in Novosibirsk, Russia. Rzhetsky did his postdoc at Penn State under Nei, who also helped him obtain his permanent residency in the United States. He joined the faculty at Columbia University in 1996. He joined the faculty of the University of Chicago in 2007, and was named the Edna K. Papazian Professor there in 2016.
