= Three-taxon analysis =

Cladistic based method of phylogenetic reconstruction

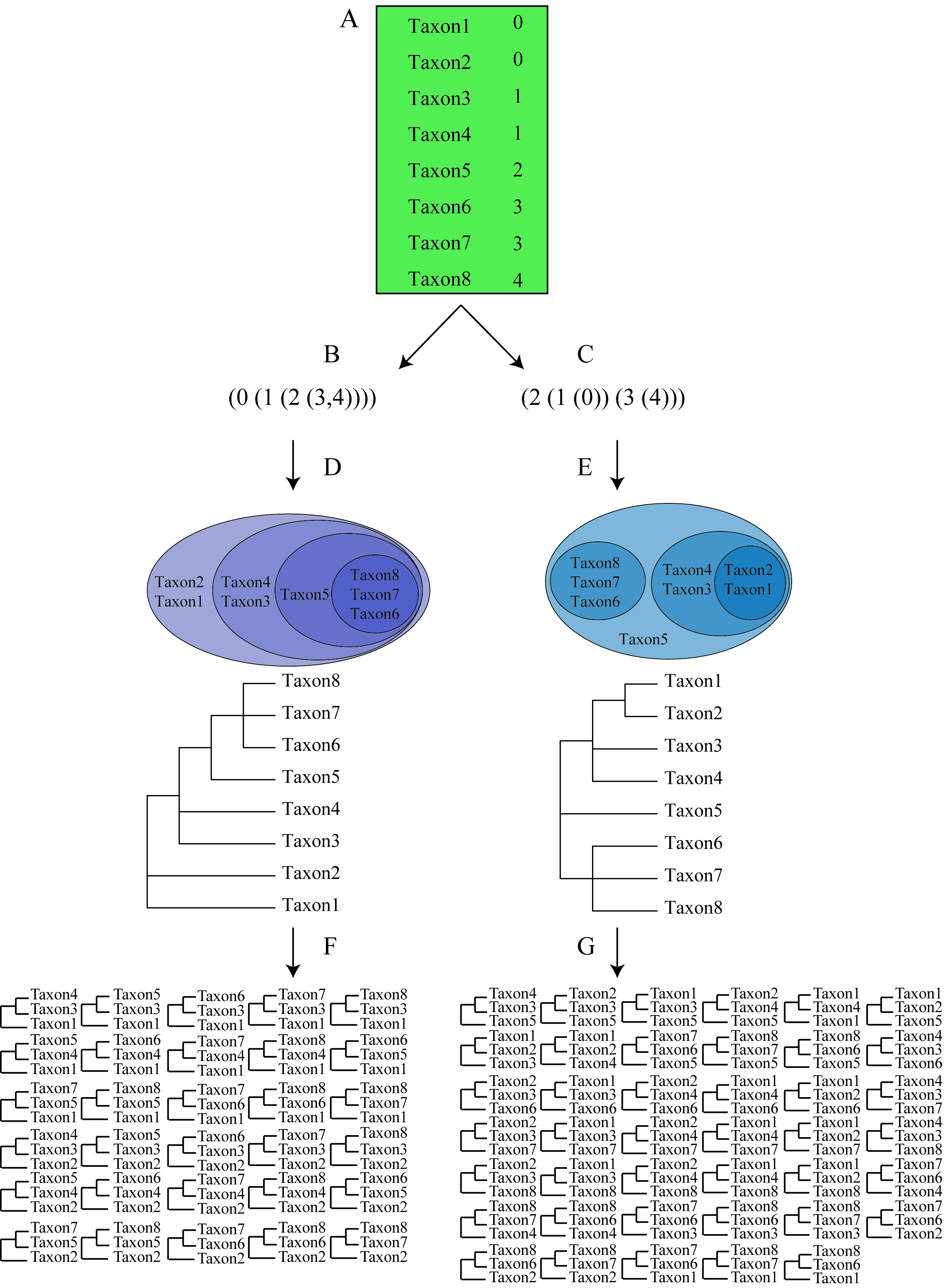
Three-taxon analysis (3ia). Modified from Figure 1 from Grand A, Corvez A, Duque Velez LM, Laurin M. 2013.

Three-taxon analysis (or TTS, three-item analysis, 3ia) is a cladistic based method of phylogenetic reconstruction. Introduced by Nelson and Platnick in 1991 to reconstruct organisms' phylogeny, this method can also be applied to biogeographic areas. It attempts to reconstruct complex phylogenetic trees by breaking the problem down into simpler chunks. Rather than try to resolve the relationships of all X taxa at once, it considers taxa 3 at a time. It is relatively easy to generate three-taxon statements (3is); that is, statements of the form "A and B are more closely related to one another than to C". Once each group of three taxa has been considered, the method constructs a tree that is consistent with as many three-item statements as possible.

From a theoretical point of view, the method has three main problems: (1) character evolution is a priori assumed to be irreversible; (2) 3is that are not logically independent are treated as if they are; (3) 3is that are considered as independent support for a given tree may be mutually exclusive on that tree.

A computer program that implement three-taxon analysis is LisBeth (for systematic and biogeographic studies). LisBeth have been freely released. A recent simulation-based study found that Three-taxon analysis yields good power and an error rate intermediate between parsimony with ordered states and parsimony with unordered states.

== See also ==
- Cladistics
