= List of phylogenetic tree visualization software =

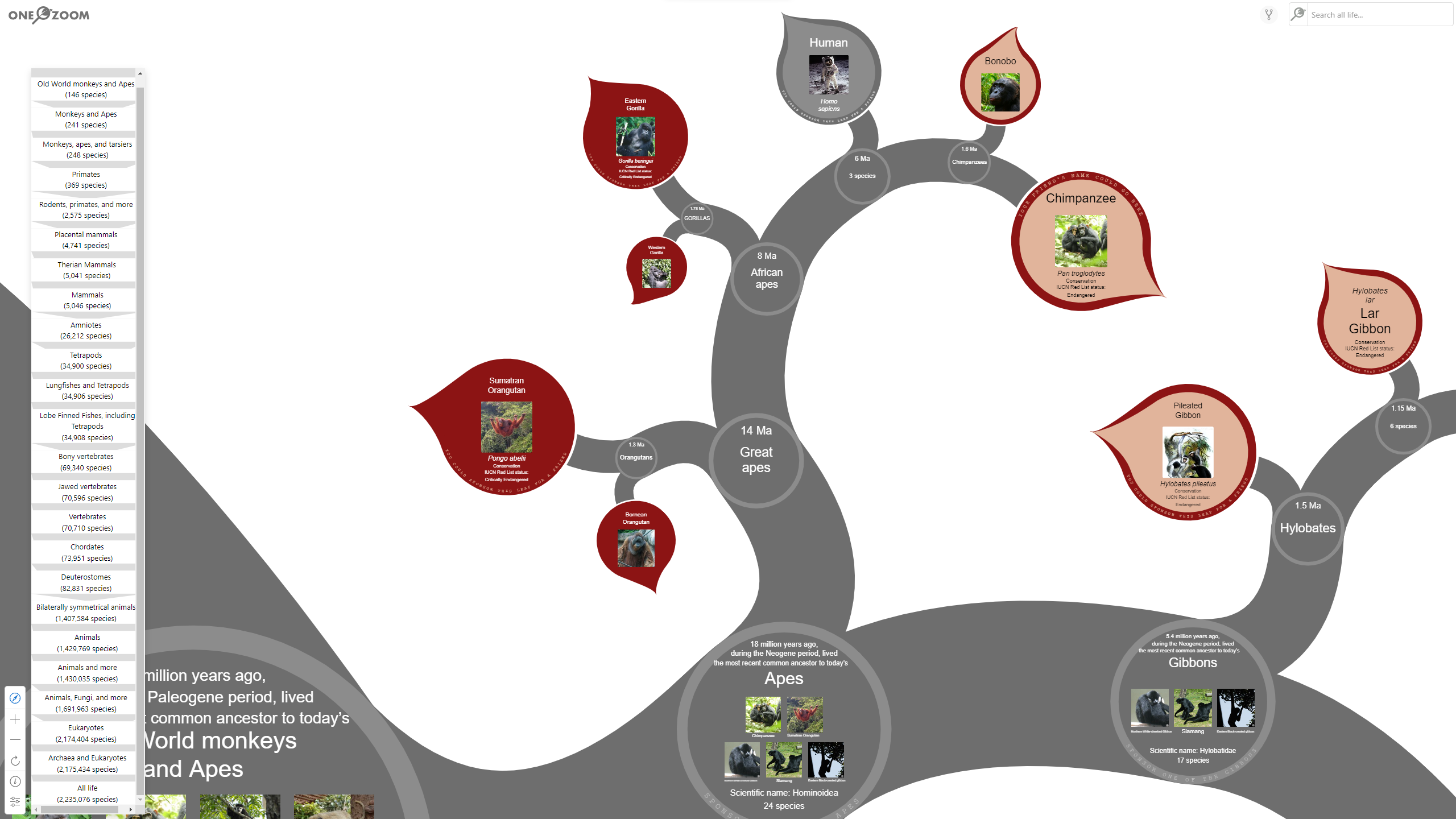
OneZoom

This list of phylogenetic tree viewing software is a compilation of software tools and web portals used in visualizing phylogenetic trees.

== Online software ==
Name	Description	License
Annotations QUick Analysis for PhylOgeNY (Aquapony)	Javascript tree viewer for Beast	CeCILL
ETE toolkit Tree Viewer	an online tool for phylogenetic tree view (newick format) that allows multiple sequence alignments to be shown together with the trees (fasta format)	
EvolView	an online tool for visualizing, annotating and managing phylogenetic trees	
IcyTree	Client-side Javascript SVG viewer for annotated rooted trees. Also supports phylogenetic networks	
Iroki	Automatic customization and visualization of phylogenetic trees	
iTOL - interactive Tree Of Life	annotate trees with various types of data and export to various graphical formats; scriptable through a batch interface	
Microreact	Link, visualise and explore sequence and meta-data using phylogenetic trees, maps and timelines	
OneZoom	uses IFIG (Interactive Fractal Inspired Graphs) to display phylogenetic trees which can be zoomed in on to increase detail	
Lifemap	Fractal-like representation to provide an interactive explorer of the tree of life "à la google maps"	
Phylo.io	View and compare up to 2 trees side by side with interactive HTML5 visualisations	
PhyloExplorer	a tool to facilitate assessment and management of phylogenetic tree collections. Given an input collection of rooted trees, PhyloExplorer provides facilities for obtaining statistics describing the collection, correcting invalid taxon names, extracting taxonomically relevant parts of the collection using a dedicated query language, and identifying related trees in the TreeBASE database.	
PHYLOViZ Online	Web-based tool for visualization, phylogenetic inference, analysis and sharing of minimum spanning trees	
PhyloWidget	view, edit, and publish phylogenetic trees online; interfaces with databases	
PRESTO	a Phylogenetic tReE viSualisaTion.	
Taxonium	web-based tool for exploration of very large trees including those with millions of nodes, with search and metadata coloring. When provided with a mutation-annotated tree, it illustrates mutations on the tree and displays final genotypes.	
T-REX (Webserver)	Tree inference and visualization (hierarchical, radial and axial tree views), Horizontal gene transfer detection and HGT network visualization	
TidyTree	A client-side HTML5/SVG Phylogenetic Tree Renderer, based on D3.js	
TreeVector	scalable, interactive, phylogenetic trees for the web, produces dynamic SVG or PNG output, implemented in Java	

== Desktop software ==
Name	Description	OS^{1}	Citation
ARB	An integrated software environment for tree visualisation and annotation	LM	
Archaeopteryx	Java tree viewer and editor (used to be ATV)	All	
BioNumerics	Universal platform for the management, storage and analysis of all types of biological data, including tree and network inference of sequence data	W	
Dendroscope	An interactive viewer for large phylogenetic trees and networks	All	
DensiTree	A viewer capable of viewing multiple overlaid trees.	All	
FigTree	Simple Java tree viewer able to read newick and nexus tree files. Can be used to color branches and produce vector artwork.	All	
JEvTrace	A multivalent browser for sequence alignment, phylogeny, and structure. Performs an interactive Evolutionary Trace and other phylogeny-inspired analysis.	All	
MEGA	Software for statistical analysis of molecular evolution. It includes different tree visualization features	All	
MultiDendrograms	Interactive open-source application to calculate and plot phylogenetic trees	All	
PHYLOViZ	Phylogenetic inference and data visualization for allelic/SNP sequences profiles using Minimum Spanning Trees	All	
SplitsTree	Software for viewing trees, cladograms, NeighborNets, and other graphs	All	
TreeDyn	Open-source software for tree manipulation and annotation allowing incorporation of meta information	All	
Treevolution	Open-source tool for circular visualization with section and ring distortion and several other features such as branch clustering and pruning	All	
TreeGraph 2	Open-source tree editor with numerous editing and formatting operations including combining different phylogenetic analyses	All	
TreeView	Treeviewing software	All	
UGENE	An opensource visual interface for Phylip 3.6 package	All	
TreeViewer	Flexible, modular software to visualise and manipulate phylogenetic trees	All	

^{1} "All" refers to Microsoft Windows, Apple macOS and Linux; L=Linux, M=Apple macOS, W=Microsoft Windows

== Libraries ==
Name	Language	Description	Citation
Bio.Phylo	Python	Phylo: Part of Biopython, this module provides classes, functions and I/O support for working with phylogenetic trees	
Bio::Phylo	Perl	A collection of Perl modules for manipulating and visualizing phylogenetic data. Bio::Phylo is one part of a comprehensive suite of Perl biology tools	
CGRphylo	R	Pipeline based on CGR method for accurate classification and tracking of rapidly evolving viruses	
ETE	Python	ETE (Environment for Tree Exploration) is a toolkit that assists in the automated manipulation, analysis and visualization of trees.	
ggtree	R	An R package for tree visualization and annotation with grammar of graphics supported	
GraPhlAn	Python	GraPhlAn is a software tool for producing high-quality circular representations of taxonomic and phylogenetic trees.	
jsPhyloSVG	Javascript	open-source javascript library for rendering highly-extensible, customizable phylogenetic trees; used for Elsevier's interactive trees	
mdendro	R	Library for the calculation and rendering of agglomerative hierarchical clustering dendrograms and multifurcating neighbor-joining phylogenetic trees	
PhyD3	Javascript	interactive phylogenetic tree visualization with numerical annotation graphs, with SVG or PNG output, implemented in D3.js	
phylotree.js	Javascript	phylotree.js is a library that extends the popular data visualization framework D3.js, and is suitable for building JavaScript applications where users can view and interact with phylogenetic trees	
PhyloPlots.jl	Julia	PhyloPlots.jl is a julia package for plotting phylogenetic trees and networks, integrated with PhyloNetworks.jl	
Phytools	R	Phylogenetic Tools for Comparative Biology (and Other Things) based in R	
toytree	Python	Toytree: A minimalist tree visualization and manipulation library for Python	

== See also ==
- List of phylogenetics software
- Phylogenetics
