= Clade =

Group of a common ancestor and all of their descendants

Cladogram (a branching tree diagram) illustrating the relationships of organisms within groups of taxa known as clades. The vertical line (stem) at the base (bottom) represents the last common ancestor. The blue and red subgroups are clades, each defined by a common ancestor stem at the base of its respective subgroup (branch). The green subgroup alone, however, is not a clade; it is a paraphyletic group relative to the blue subgroup because it excludes the blue branch, which shares the same common ancestor. Together, the green and blue subgroups form a clade.

In biology, a clade (/kleɪd/) (from Ancient Greek κλάδος (kládos) 'branch'), also known as a monophyletic group or natural group, is a group of organisms that is composed of a common ancestor and all of its descendants. Clades are the fundamental unit of cladistics, a modern approach to taxonomy adopted by most biological fields.

The common ancestor may be an individual, a population, or a species (extinct or extant). Clades are nested, one in another, as each branch in turn splits into smaller branches. These splits reflect evolutionary history as populations diverged and evolved independently. Clades are termed monophyletic (Greek: "one clan") groups.

Over the last few decades, the cladistic approach has revolutionized biological classification and revealed surprising evolutionary relationships among organisms. Increasingly, taxonomists try to avoid naming taxa that are not clades; that is, taxa that are not monophyletic. Some of the relationships between organisms that the molecular biology arm of cladistics has revealed include that fungi are closer relatives to animals than they are to plants, archaea are now considered different from bacteria, and multicellular organisms may have evolved from archaea.

The term clade is also used with a similar meaning in other fields besides biology, such as historical linguistics; see Cladistics § In disciplines other than biology.

== Naming and etymology ==
The term clade was coined in 1957 by the biologist Julian Huxley to refer to the result of cladogenesis, the evolutionary splitting of a parent species into two distinct species, a concept Huxley borrowed from Bernhard Rensch.

== History of nomenclature and taxonomy ==
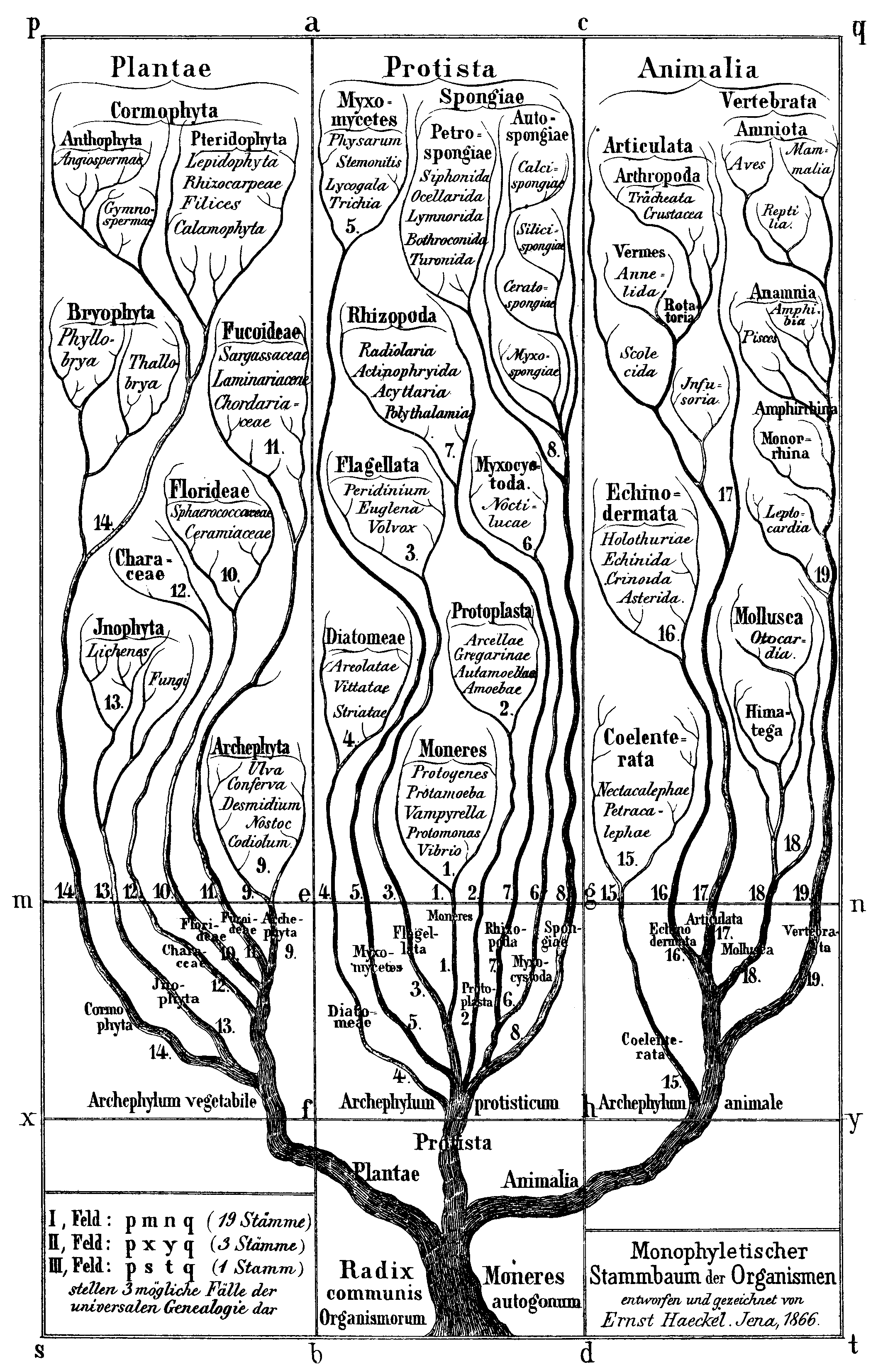
Early phylogenetic tree by Haeckel, 1866. Groups once thought to be more advanced, such as birds ("Aves"), are placed at the top.

The idea of a clade did not exist in pre-Darwinian Linnaean taxonomy, which was based by necessity only on internal or external morphological similarities between organisms. Many of the better known animal groups in Linnaeus's original Systema Naturae (mostly vertebrate groups) do represent clades. The phenomenon of convergent evolution is responsible for many cases of misleading similarities in the morphology of groups that evolved from different lineages.

With the increasing realization in the first half of the 19th century that species had changed and split through the ages, classification increasingly came to be seen as branches on the evolutionary tree of life. The publication of Darwin's theory of evolution in 1859 gave this view increasing weight. In 1876 Thomas Henry Huxley, an early advocate of evolutionary theory, proposed a revised taxonomy based on a concept strongly resembling clades, although the term clade itself would not be coined until 1957 by his grandson, Julian Huxley.

German biologist Emil Hans Willi Hennig (1913–1976) is considered to be the founder of cladistics. He proposed a classification system that represented repeated branchings of the family tree, as opposed to the previous systems, which put organisms on a "ladder", with supposedly more "advanced" organisms at the top.

Taxonomists have increasingly worked to make the taxonomic system reflect evolution. When it comes to naming, this principle is not always compatible with the traditional rank-based nomenclature (in which only taxa associated with a rank can be named) because not enough ranks exist to name a long series of nested clades. For these and other reasons, phylogenetic nomenclature has been developed; it is still controversial.

As an example, see the full classification of Anas platyrhynchos (the mallard duck) with over 40 clades from Eukaryota down by following this Wikispecies link and clicking on "Expand".

The name of a clade is conventionally a plural, where the singular refers to each member individually. A unique exception is the reptile clade Dracohors, which was made by haplology from Latin "draco" and "cohors", i.e. "the dragon cohort"; its form with a suffix added should be e.g. "dracohortian".

== Definition ==
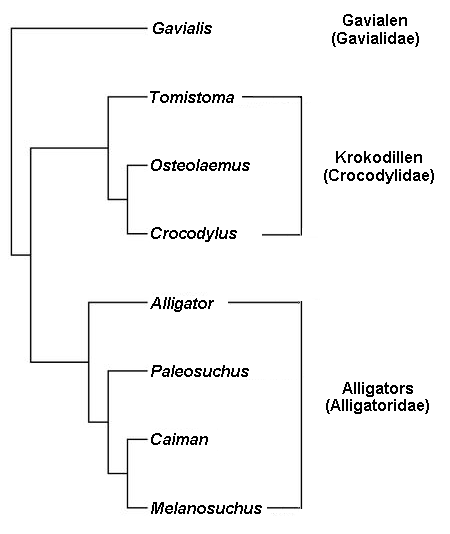
Gavialidae, Crocodylidae and Alligatoridae are clade names that are here applied to a phylogenetic tree of crocodylians.

A clade is by definition monophyletic, meaning that it contains one ancestor which can be an organism, a population, or a species and all its descendants. (Note: A semantic case has been made in 2008 that the name should be "holophyletic", but this term has not acquired widespread use. For more information, see holophyly.) The ancestor can be known or unknown; any and all members of a clade can be extant or extinct.

== Clades and phylogenetic trees ==
The science that tries to reconstruct phylogenetic trees and thus discover clades is called phylogenetics or cladistics, the latter term coined by Ernst Mayr (1965), derived from "clade". The results of phylogenetic/cladistic analyses are tree-shaped diagrams called cladograms; they, and all their branches, are phylogenetic hypotheses.

Three methods of defining clades are featured in phylogenetic nomenclature: node-, stem-, and apomorphy-based (see Phylogenetic nomenclature for detailed definitions).

== Terminology ==
Cladogram of modern primate groups. All tarsiers are haplorhines, but not all haplorhines are tarsiers; all apes are catarrhines, but not all catarrhines are apes; etc.

The relationship between clades can be described in several ways:

- A clade located within a clade is said to be nested within that clade. In the diagram, the ape clade is nested within the primate clade.
- Two clades are sisters if they have an immediate common ancestor. In the diagram, lemurs and lorises are sister clades, while humans and tarsiers are not.
- Clade A is basal to a clade B if A branches off the lineage leading to B before the first branch that only leads to members of B. In the adjacent diagram, the prosimian clade is basal to the hominoids/ape clade. It would be inappropriate, however, to refer to either haplorhines or prosimians as the most basal grouping of primates, because their branches are in equivalent positions; it is better to say that prosimians are the sister group to haplorhines (the rest of the primates). This also avoids unintended implications of relative value between basal clades, e.g. due to impact of sampling diversity and extinction. Basal clades should not be confused with stem groupings, as the latter is associated with paraphyletic or unresolved groupings.

=== Age ===
The age of a clade can be described based on two different reference points, crown age and stem age. The crown age of a clade refers to the age of the most recent common ancestor of all of the species in the clade. The stem age of a clade refers to the time that the ancestral lineage of the clade diverged from its sister clade. A clade's stem age is either the same as or older than its crown age. Ages of clades cannot be directly observed. They are inferred, either from stratigraphy of fossils, or from molecular clock estimates.

== Viruses ==
Phylogenetic tree of the SIV and HIV viruses showing clades (subtypes) of the virus.

Viruses, and particularly RNA viruses, form clades. These are useful in tracking the spread of viral infections. HIV, for example, has clades called subtypes, which vary in geographical prevalence. HIV subtype (clade) B, for example is predominant in Europe, the Americas and Japan, whereas subtype A is more common in east Africa.

== See also ==
- Adaptive radiation
- Binomial nomenclature
- Biological classification
- Cladistics
- Crown group
- Grade
- Monophyly
- Paraphyly
- Phylogenetic network
- Phylogenetic nomenclature
- Phylogenetics
- Polyphyly
