= Quasi-median networks =

The concept of a quasi-median network is a generalization of the concept of a median network that was introduced to represent multistate characters. Note that, unlike median networks, quasi-median networks are not split networks. A quasi-median network is defined as a phylogenetic network, the node set of which is given by the quasi-median closure of the condensed version of M (let M be a multiple sequence alignment of DNA sequences on X) and in which any two nodes are joined by an edge if and only if the sequences associated with the nodes differ in exactly one position. The quasi-median closure is defined as the set of all sequences that can be obtained by repeatedly taking the quasi-median of any three sequences in the set and then adding the result to the set.
