= Split (phylogenetics) =

Bipartition of a set of taxa

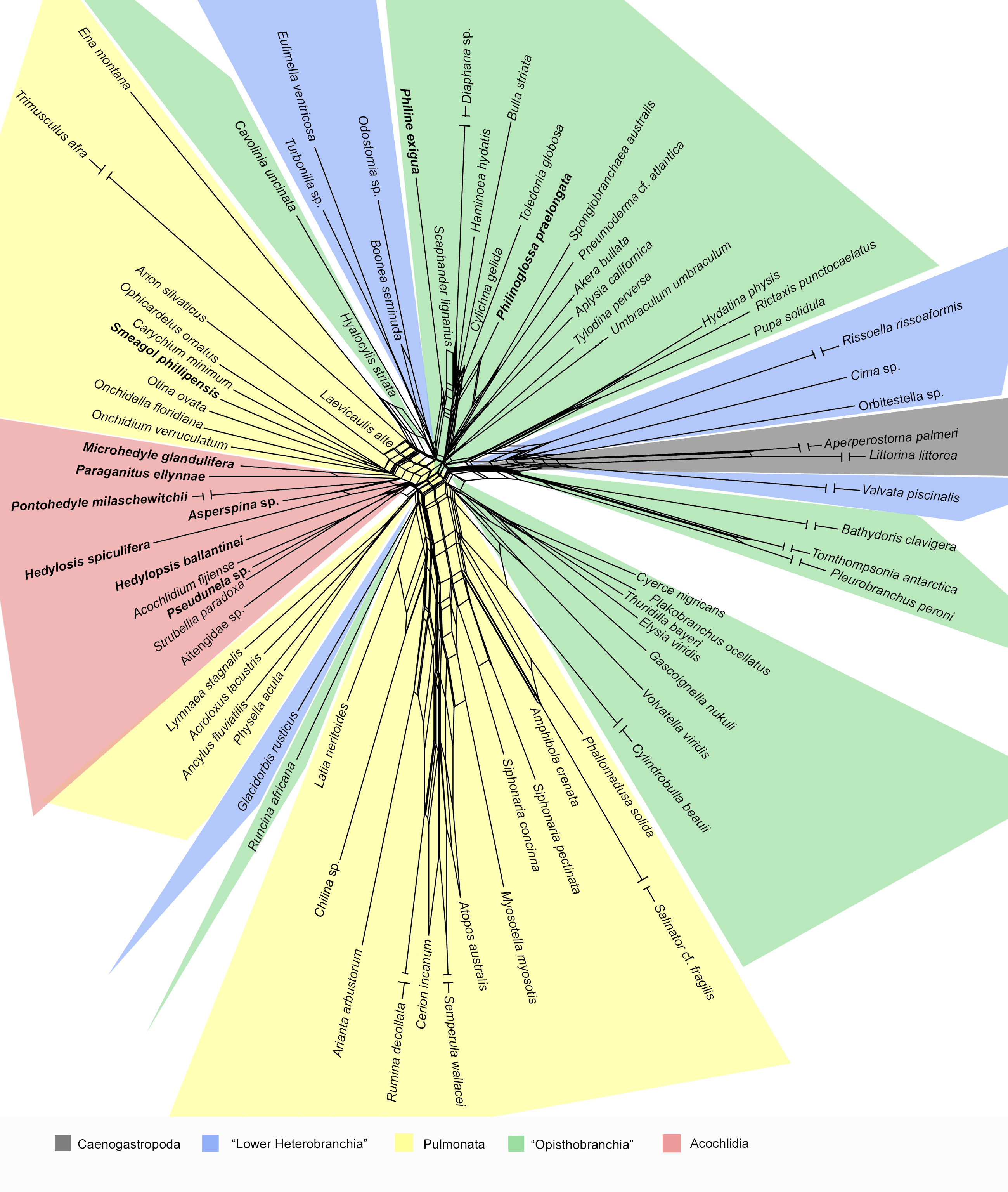
Graph of neighbor-net phylogenetic network shows a clear split support (visualised by long parallel edges) for Acochlidiacea (in red color). The graph is based on datasets by Jörger et al. (2010) and generated by SplitsTree.

A split in phylogenetics is a bipartition of a set of taxa, and the smallest unit of information in unrooted phylogenetic trees: each edge of an unrooted phylogenetic tree represents one split, and the tree can be efficiently reconstructed from its set of splits. Moreover, when given several trees, the splits occurring in more than half of these trees give rise to a consensus tree, and the splits occurring in a smaller fraction of the trees generally give rise to a consensus split network. Pairs of splits are compatible if any of the subsets defined by each split do not overlap.

== See also ==
- SplitsTree, a program for inferring phylogenetic (split) networks.
