= Split networks =

For a given set of taxa, and a set of splits S on the taxa, usually together with a non-negative weighting, which may represent character changes distance, or may also have a more abstract interpretation, if the set of splits S is compatible, then it can be represented by an unrooted phylogenetic tree and each edge in the tree corresponds to exactly one of the splits. More generally, S can always be represented by a split network, which is an unrooted phylogenetic network with the property that every split in S is represented by an array of parallel edges in the network.
