= OneZoom =

Website with tree of life visualisations

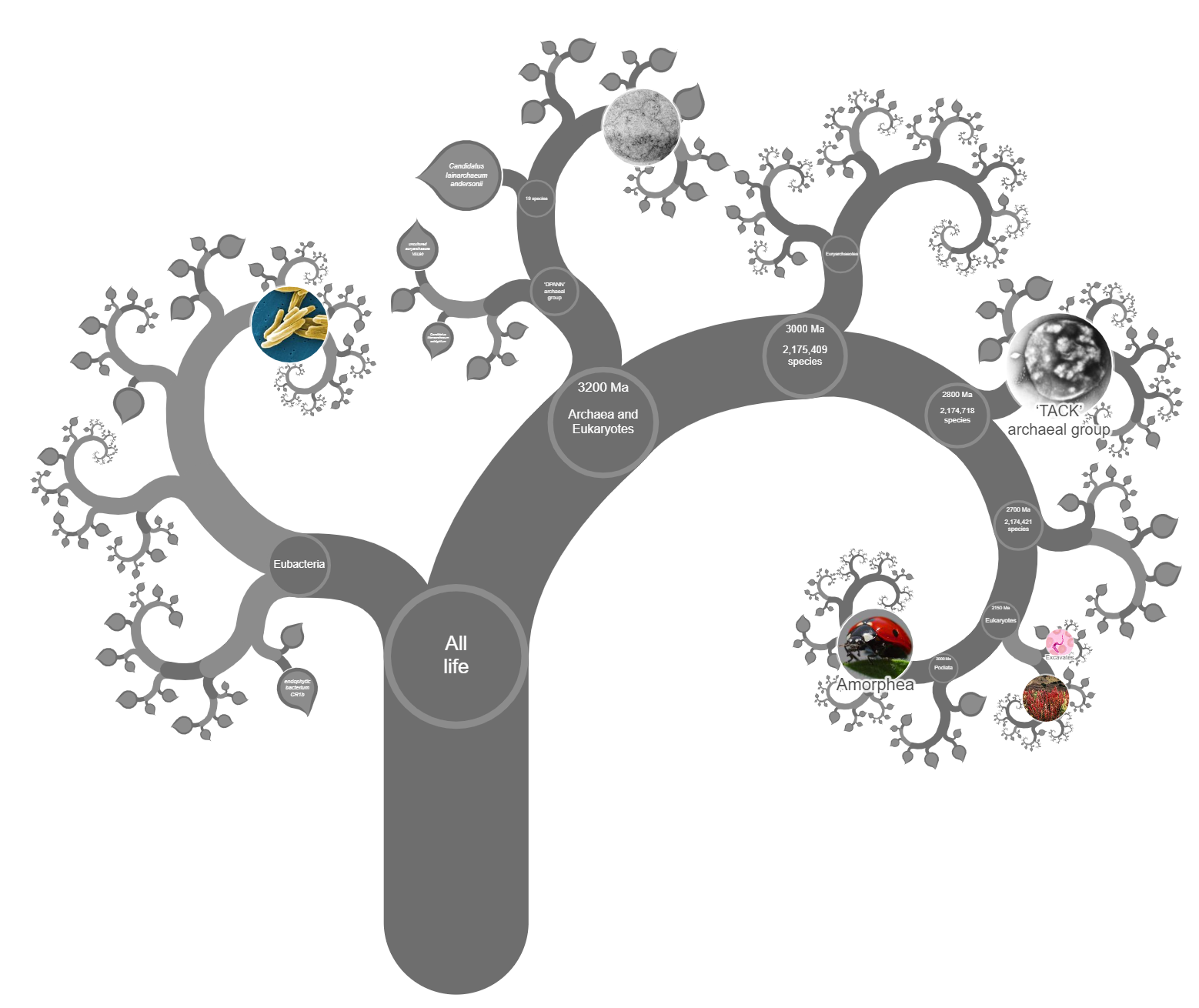
The OneZoom Tree of Life

The OneZoom Tree of Life Explorer is a web-based phylogenetic tree software. It aims to map the evolutionary connection of all known life. As of 2023 it includes over 2.2 million species.

== Organisation ==
OneZoom was created by James Rosindell and is a charity registered in London. It is sponsored by individuals such as Richard Dawkins.

== Tree of Life Explorer ==
The design is based on the Pythagoras tree; besides a default spiral design, there are other options, such as polytomy.

Leaves and nodes provide links to other websites, such as Wikipedia, Encyclopedia of Life or the NCBI taxonomy browser. The leaves representing single species are colour-coded according to their IUCN extinction risk, with red indicating a threatened species, black representing a recently extinct species, and grey representing species with unknown extinction risk.

== See also ==
- List of phylogenetic tree visualization software
