= TreeBASE =

Repository of phylogenetic data

TreeBASE was a repository of phylogenetic data published in scientific journals. In phylogenetic studies, research data are collected or generated, such as comparative observations (e.g. character state matrices or multiple sequence alignments) made on a set of taxa, metadata about these taxa, and the phylogenetic trees that are inferred to best describe the evolutionary relationships between the taxa.

== Mission ==
The purpose of the TreeBASE project was to provide stable records and identifiers for these data, so that other workers can refer to their deposited data in their publication, and other scientists can locate the data and use them to verify the original research or to include or extend them in further analyses.

== History and funding ==
The project was started in 1994, with funding from the US National Science Foundation. After this prototype, a redesign was initiated under the CIPRES project. This new version was released in March 2010 and has been supported by, among others, the pPOD project, which funded the addition of a RESTful web service interface with CQL search facilities, and National Evolutionary Synthesis Center (NESCent), which hosted the database and web server.

Starting in Winter 2010, TreeBASE was reorganized and became associated with the Phyloinformatics Research Foundation

In 2022, TreeBASE was taken offline due to security issues which were unable to be fixed with project resources; the future of the database is uncertain.
