= SplitsTree =

Software for inferring bioinformatics split graphs

- Developer(s): Daniel Huson and David Bryant
- Stable release: 4.17.1 / 2021
- Preview release: 5.3 / 2021
- Operating system: Windows, Linux, Mac OS X
- Type: Bioinformatics
- License: Proprietary
- Website: uni-tuebingen.de/fakultaeten/mathematisch-naturwissenschaftliche-fakultaet/fachbereiche/informatik/lehrstuehle/algorithms-in-bioinformatics/software/splitstree/

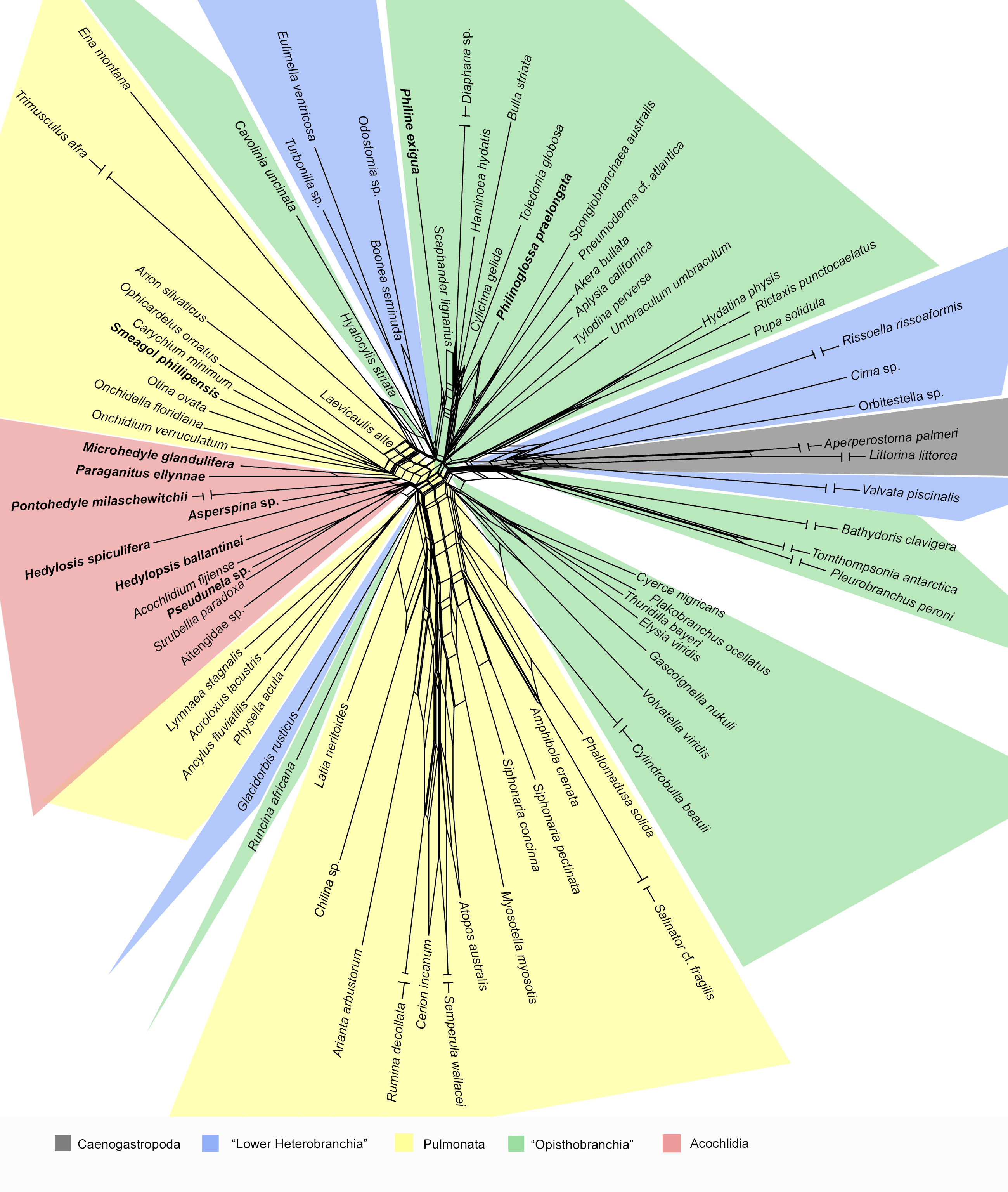
An example of a neighbor-net phylogenetic network generated by SplitsTree v4.6.

SplitsTree is a freeware program for inferring phylogenetic trees, phylogenetic networks, or, more generally, split graphs, from various types of data such as a sequence alignment, a distance matrix or a set of trees.

== Software ==
SplitsTree implements published methods such as split decomposition, neighbor-net, consensus networks, super networks methods or methods for computing hybridization or simple recombination networks. It uses the NEXUS file format. The splits graph is defined using a special data block (SPLITS block).

== See also ==
- Phylogenetic tree viewers
- Dendroscope
- MEGAN
