= Kalmanson combinatorial conditions =

In mathematics, the Kalmanson combinatorial conditions are a set of conditions on the distance matrix used in determining the solvability of the traveling salesman problem. These conditions apply to a special kind of cost matrix, the Kalmanson matrix, and are named after Kenneth Kalmanson.
