= Dendroscope =

Computer software program

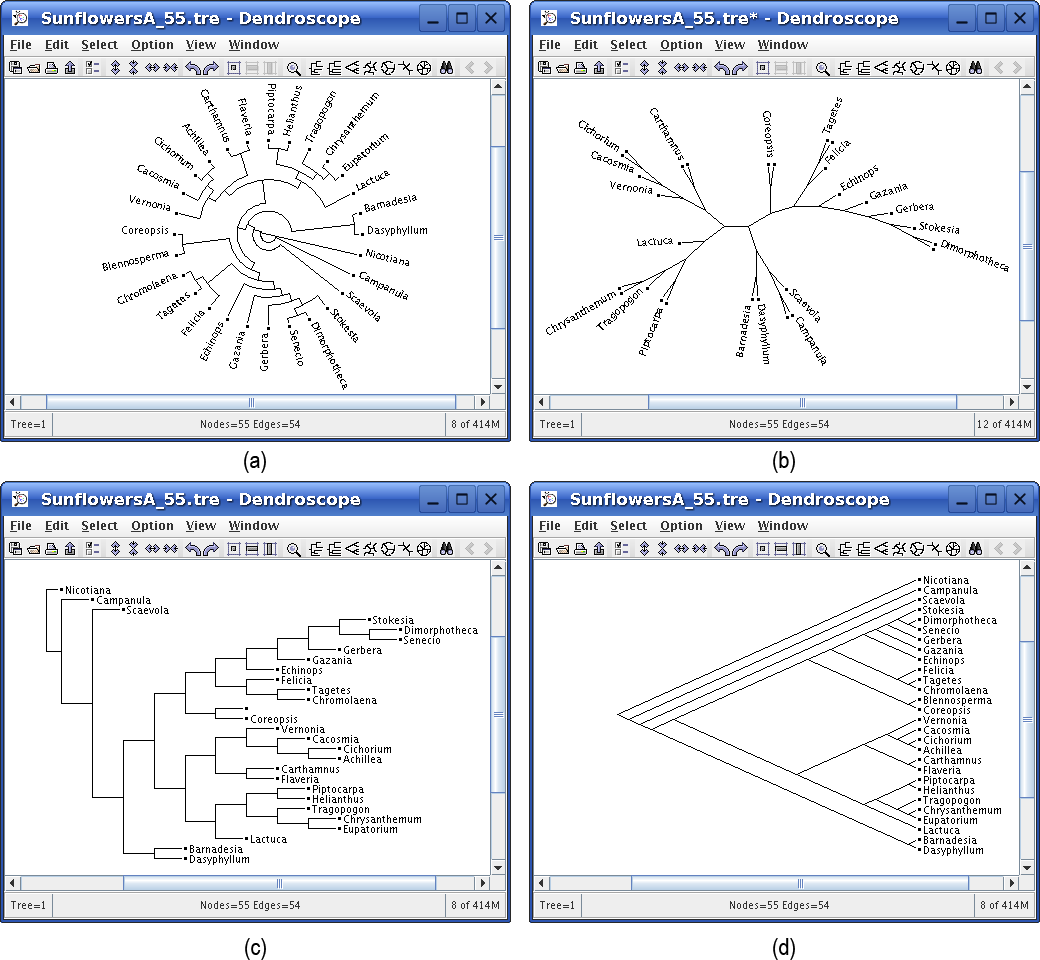
- Dendroscope: (a) circular cladogram, (b) radial phylogram, (c) rectangular phylogram, and (d) slanted cladogram. Image by Huson et al.
- Developer(s): Daniel Huson et al.
- Stable release: 3.6.0 / 2019
- Repository: github.com/danielhuson/dendroscope3
- Operating system: Windows, Linux, Mac OS X
- Type: Bioinformatics
- License: GPLv3 or later
- Website: http://ab.inf.uni-tuebingen.de/software/dendroscope/

Dendroscope is an interactive computer software program written in Java for viewing Phylogenetic trees. This program is designed to view trees of all sizes and is very useful for creating figures. Dendroscope can be used for a variety of analyses of molecular data sets but is particularly designed for metagenomics or analyses of uncultured environmental samples.

It was developed by Daniel Huson and his colleagues at the University of Tübingen in Germany, who also created SplitsTree.

== See also ==
- List of phylogenetic tree visualization software
- SplitsTree
- MEGAN
