= Peter Forster (geneticist) =

German geneticist

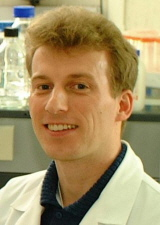
- Born: June 27, 1967 (age 59); London
- Education: Christian-Albrechts-University, Kiel; University of Hamburg
- Known for: Prehistoric languages, forensic genetics
- Scientific career
- Fields: Genetics
- Workplaces: University of Münster, Cambridge University
- Thesis: Dispersal and differentiation of modern Homo sapiens analysed with mitochondrial DNA (1997)

Peter Forster FRSB (born 27 June 1967) is a geneticist researching the prehistoric origins and ancestry of mankind. In addition to archaeogenetics, he has published on the reconstruction and spread of prehistoric languages and in the field of forensic genetics.

== Biography ==
Peter Forster studied chemistry at the Christian-Albrechts-University in Kiel and the University of Hamburg. At the Heinrich-Pette-Institut for Virology and Immunology in Hamburg, he specialised in genetics and obtained his PhD degree in 1997 in biology on the topic of "Dispersal and differentiation of modern Homo sapiens analysed with mitochondrial DNA". After postdoctoral research at the Institute for Legal Medicine at the Westphalian Wilhelms-University in Münster, he was appointed Research Fellow at the McDonald Institute for Archaeological Research in Cambridge University in 1999, and furthermore a Fellow at Murray Edwards College at the University of Cambridge. He is on the editorial board of the International Journal of Legal Medicine, and a director of Roots for Real. Peter Forster was elected a life member of the German Academy of Sciences Leopoldina. In January 2016 the Royal Society of Biology elected Peter Forster as a Fellow.

== Human Origins ==
Modern humans have existed in Africa for around 200,000 years. Peter Forster discovered on the basis of modern and ancient DNA that there has only been a single successful migration out of Africa during prehistory, and he dated this emigration to around 60,000 years ago. The size of this emigrant group, according to his estimate, was less than 200 people (BBC 2009: African tribe populated rest of the world). Their descendants travelled on average about 200 to 1,000 metres per year and reached Europe and Australia just over 40,000 years ago, and America around 20,000 years ago. Due to the small numbers of founders, and due to their subsequent isolation on separate continents, differences between populations accumulated, yielding the distinctive sets of features that are perceived today as human races. On the basis of geographic DNA patterns, Forster discovered that the current language areas on all continents arose primarily through the prehistoric spread of culturally or militarily dominant men, whose languages were evidently favoured by the local women and passed on to their children. Hence, there is a statistical relationship today between the language and the Y chromosome types of modern males, but no such relationship between mtDNA and language in females today. Peter Forster has also applied his statistical evolutionary approach on languages directly and has calculated that the Celtic languages spread in the Bronze Age from about 3000 BC, and that the Germanic languages spread during the Iron Age from about 600 BC, as far as Britain.

To obtain these results, Forster has compiled, proofread and corrected DNA- and language databases, and developed, in collaboration with his colleagues, phylogenetic network analysis of mitochondrial DNA, Y-chromosomal DNA, and linguistic data, as well as the concept of the mtDNA- and Y-chromosomal "clock". He has developed practical applications of his research in the shape of DNA ancestry tests, geographical ancestry tests and relationship tests for casework in genealogy, family research and forensics.

== Bibliography ==
- Forster P: "Necessary Brain?". Nature 375:444, 1995.
- The Y Chromosome Consortium: "A nomenclature system for the tree of human Y-chromosomal binary haplogroups." Genome Res 12:339-348, 2002.
- Forster L, Forster P, Lutz-Bonengel S, Willkomm H, Brinkmann B: "Natural radioactivity and human mitochondrial DNA mutations." Proc Natl Acad Sci USA, 2002.
- Forster P: "Ice Ages and the mitochondrial DNA chronology of human dispersals: a review." Phil Trans R Soc Lond B 359:255-264, 2004.
- Forster P, Renfrew C: "Phylogenetic Methods and the Prehistory of Languages." McDonald Institute Press, University of Cambridge, 2006. ISBN 978-1-902937-33-5
- Matsumura S, Forster P: "Generation time and effective population size in Polar Eskimos." Proc R Soc B 275:1501-1508, 2008.
- Forster P, Renfrew C: "Mother Tongue and Y Chromosomes." Science 333:1390-1391, 2011.
- Forster P, Hohoff C, Dunkelmann B, Schürenkamp M, Pfeiffer H, Neuhuber F, Brinkmann B: "Elevated germline mutation rate in teenage fathers." Proc R Soc B 282:20142898, 2015.

== German Literature ==
Elisabeth Hamel (2007) Das Werden der Völker in Europa. Tenea-Verlag, Berlin.
