= Neighbor-net =

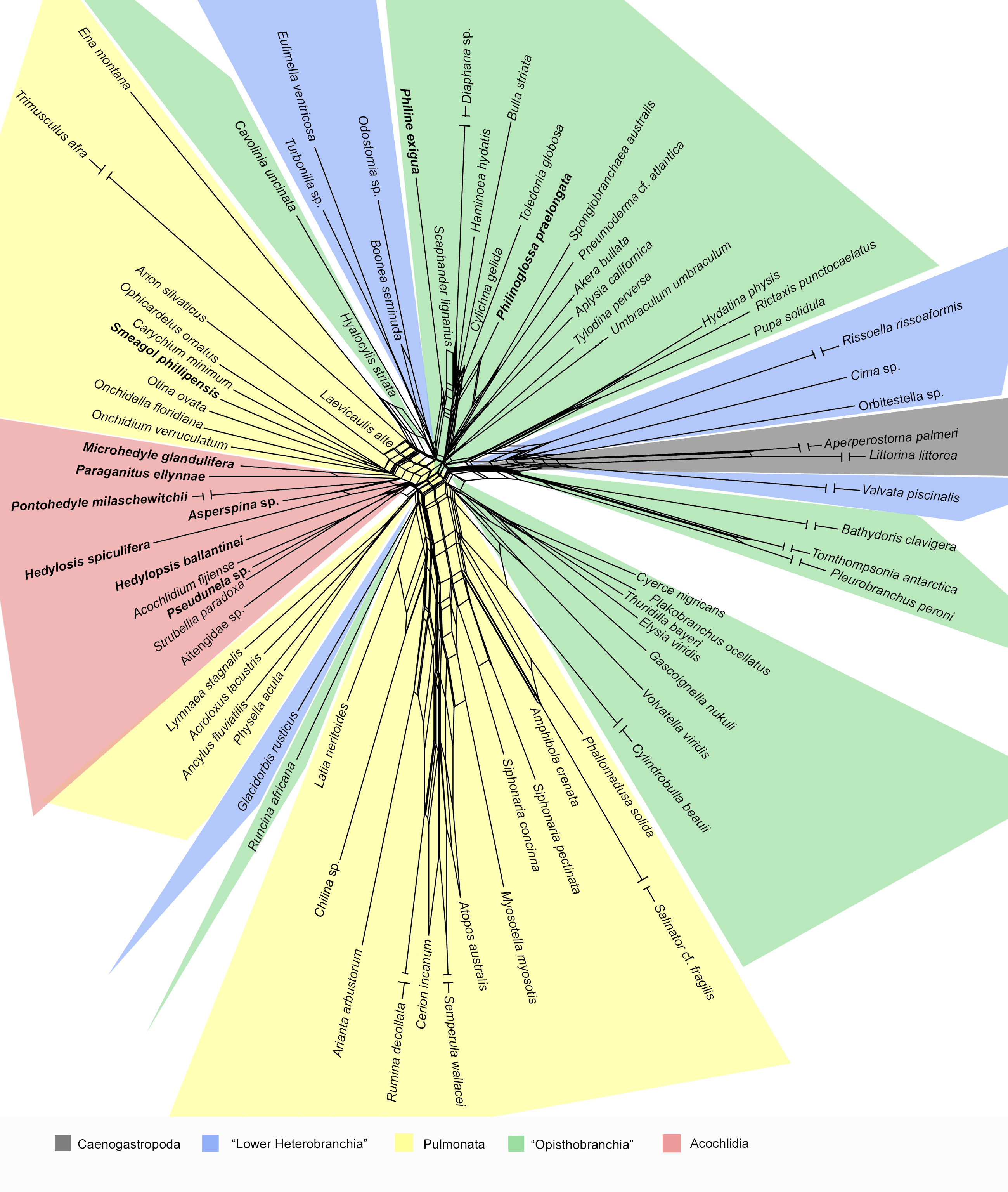
An example of a neighbor-net phylogenetic network generated by SplitsTree v4.6.

NeighborNet is an algorithm for constructing phylogenetic networks which is loosely based on the neighbor joining algorithm. Like neighbor joining, the method takes a distance matrix as input, and works by agglomerating clusters. However, the NeighborNet algorithm can lead to collections of clusters which overlap and do not form a hierarchy, and are represented using a type of phylogenetic network called a splits graph. If the distance matrix satisfies the Kalmanson combinatorial conditions then Neighbor-net will return the corresponding circular ordering. The method is implemented in the SplitsTree and R/Phangorn packages.

Examples of the application of Neighbor-net can be found in virology, horticulture, dinosaur genetics, comparative linguistics, and archaeology.
