= Phylogenetics =

Study of evolutionary relationships between organisms

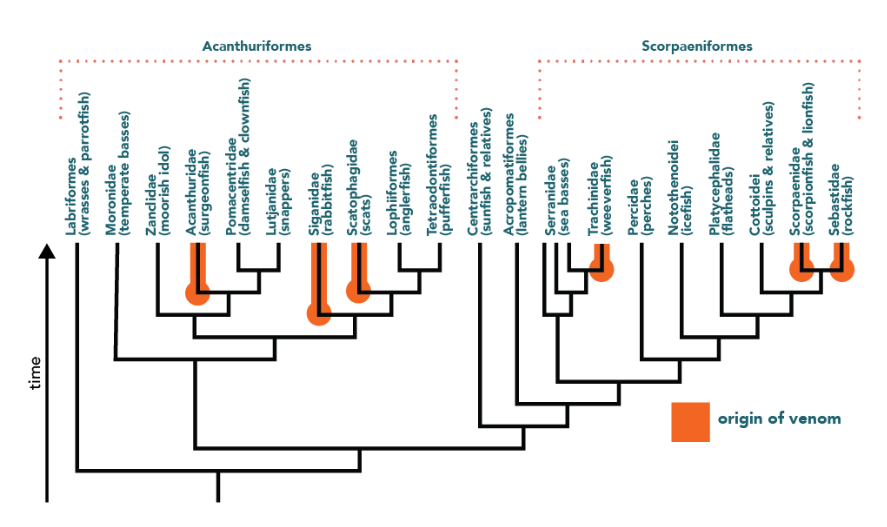
One small clade of fish, showing how venom has evolved multiple times.

In biology, phylogenetics (/ˌfaɪloʊdʒəˈnɛtɪks, -lə-/) is the study of the evolutionary history of life using observable characteristics of organisms (or genes), which is known as phylogenetic inference. It infers the relationship among organisms based on empirical data and observed heritable traits of DNA sequences, protein amino acid sequences, protein structure, and morphology. The results are a phylogenetic tree—a diagram depicting the hypothetical relationships among the organisms, reflecting their inferred evolutionary history.

The tips of a phylogenetic tree represent the observed entities, which can be living taxa or fossils. A phylogenetic diagram can be rooted or unrooted. A rooted tree diagram indicates the hypothetical common ancestor of the taxa represented on the tree. An unrooted tree diagram (a network) makes no assumption about directionality of character state transformation, and does not show the origin or "root" of the taxa in question.

In addition to their use for inferring phylogenetic patterns among taxa, phylogenetic analyses are often employed to represent relationships among genes or individual organisms. Such uses have become central to understanding biodiversity, evolution, ecology, and genomes.

Phylogenetics is a component of systematics that uses similarities and differences of the characteristics of species to interpret their evolutionary relationships and origins.

In the field of cancer research, phylogenetics can be used to study the clonal evolution of tumors and molecular chronology, predicting and showing how cell populations vary throughout the progression of the disease and during treatment, using whole genome sequencing techniques. Because cancer cells reproduce mitotically, the evolutionary processes behind cancer progression are quite different from those in sexually-reproducing species. These differences manifest in several areas: the types of aberrations that occur, the rates of mutation, the high heterogeneity (variability) of tumor cell subclones, and the absence of genetic recombination.

Phylogenetics can also aid in drug design and discovery. Phylogenetics allows scientists to organize species and can show which species are likely to have inherited particular traits that are medically useful, such as producing biologically active compounds - those that have effects on the human body. For example, in drug discovery, venom-producing animals are particularly useful. Venoms from these animals produce several important drugs, e.g., ACE inhibitors and Prialt (Ziconotide). To find new venoms, scientists turn to phylogenetics to screen for closely related species that may have the same useful traits. The phylogenetic tree shows venomous species of fish, and related fish they may also contain the trait. Using this approach, biologists are able to identify the fish, snake and lizard species that may be venomous. In forensic science, phylogenetic tools are useful to assess DNA evidence for court cases. Phylogenetic analysis has been used in criminal trials to exonerate or hold individuals.

HIV forensics uses phylogenetic analysis to track the differences in HIV genes and determine the relatedness of two samples. HIV forensics have limitations, i.e., it cannot be the sole proof of transmission between individuals, and phylogenetic analysis which shows transmission relatedness does not indicate direction of transmission.

== Taxonomy and classification ==
Taxonomy is the identification, naming, and classification of organisms. The Linnaean classification system developed in the 1700s by Carolus Linnaeus is the foundation for modern classification methods. Linnaean classification traditionally relied on the phenotypes or physical characteristics of organisms to group species. With the emergence of biochemistry, classifications of organisms are now often based on DNA sequence data or a combination of DNA and morphology. Many systematists contend that only monophyletic taxa should be recognized as named groups.

The degree to which classification depends on inferred evolutionary history differs depending on the school of taxonomy: phenetics ignores phylogenetic speculation altogether, trying to represent the similarity between organisms instead; cladistics (phylogenetic systematics) tries to reflect phylogeny in its classifications by only recognizing groups based on shared, derived characters (synapomorphies); evolutionary taxonomy tries to take into account both the branching pattern and "degree of difference" to find a compromise between inferred patterns of common ancestry and evolutionary distinctness.

== Inference of a phylogenetic tree ==
Usual methods of phylogenetic inference involve computational approaches implementing an optimality criterion and methods of parsimony, maximum likelihood (ML), and MCMC-based Bayesian inference. All these depend upon an implicit or explicit mathematical model describing the relative probabilities of character state transformation within and among the characters observed.

Phenetics, popular in the mid-20th century but now largely obsolete, used distance matrix-based methods to construct trees based on overall similarity in morphology or similar observable traits which was often assumed to approximate phylogenetic relationships. Neighbor Joining is a phenetic method that is often used for building similarity trees for DNA barcodes.

Prior to 1950, phylogenetic inferences were generally presented as narrative scenarios. Such methods were often ambiguous and lacked explicit criteria for evaluating alternative hypotheses.

== Impacts of taxon sampling ==
In phylogenetic analysis, taxon sampling selects a small group of exemplar taxa to infer the evolutionary history of a clade. This process is also known as stratified sampling or clade-based sampling. Judicious taxon sampling is important, given limited resources to compare and analyze every species within a diverse clade, and also given the computational limits of phylogenetic software. Poor taxon sampling may result in incorrect phylogenetic inferences. Long branch attraction, in which nonrelated branches are incorrectly grouped by shared, homoplastic nucleotide sites, is a theoretical cause for inaccuracy

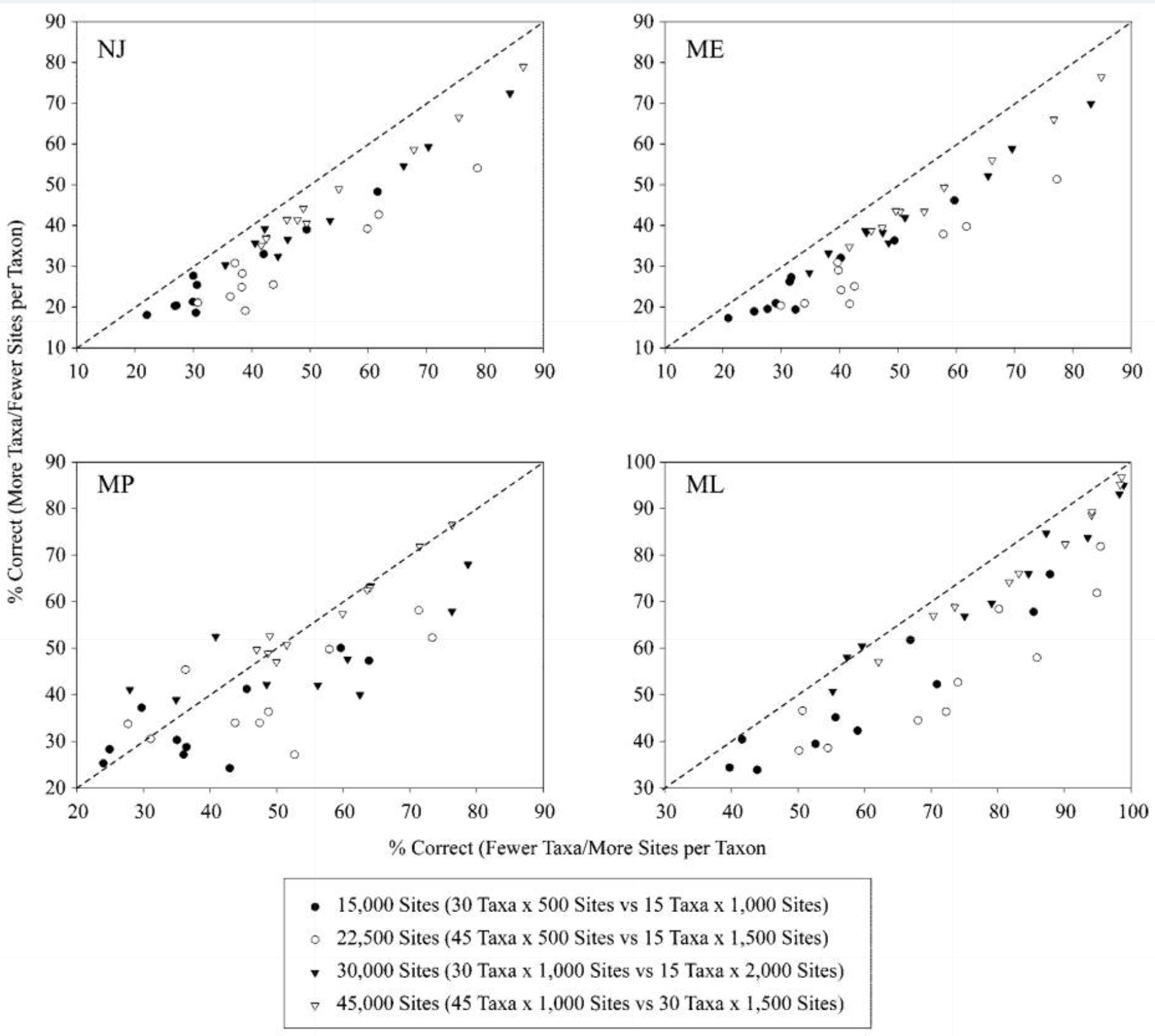
Percentage of inter-ordinal branches reconstructed with a constant number of bases and four phylogenetic tree construction models; neighbor-joining (NJ), minimum evolution (ME), unweighted maximum parsimony (MP), and maximum likelihood (ML). Demonstrates phylogenetic analysis with fewer taxa and more genes per taxon matches more often with the replicable consensus tree. The dotted line demonstrates an equal accuracy increase between the two taxon sampling methods. Figure is property of Michael S. Rosenberg and Sudhir Kumar as presented in the journal article Taxon Sampling, Bioinformatics, and Phylogenomics.

There are debates if increasing the number of taxa sampled improves phylogenetic accuracy more than increasing the number of genes sampled per taxon. Differences in each method's sampling impact the number of nucleotide sites utilized in a sequence alignment, which may contribute to disagreements. For example, phylogenetic trees constructed utilizing a more significant number of total nucleotides are generally more accurate, as supported by phylogenetic trees' bootstrapping replicability from random sampling.

The graphic presented in Taxon Sampling, Bioinformatics, and Phylogenomics, compares the correctness of phylogenetic trees generated using fewer taxa and more sites per taxon on the x-axis to more taxa and fewer sites per taxon on the y-axis. With fewer taxa, more genes are sampled amongst the taxonomic group; in comparison, with more taxa added to the taxonomic sampling group, fewer genes are sampled. Each method has the same total number of nucleotide sites sampled. Furthermore, the dotted line represents a 1:1 accuracy between the two sampling methods. As seen in the graphic, most of the plotted points are located below the dotted line, which indicates gravitation toward increased accuracy when sampling fewer taxa with more sites per taxon. The research performed utilizes four different phylogenetic tree construction models to verify the theory; neighbor-joining (NJ), minimum evolution (ME), unweighted maximum parsimony (MP), and maximum likelihood (ML). In the majority of models, sampling fewer taxon with more sites per taxon demonstrated higher accuracy.

Generally, with the alignment of a relatively equal number of total nucleotide sites, sampling more genes per taxon has higher bootstrapping replicability than sampling more taxa. However, unbalanced datasets within genomic databases make increasing the gene comparison per taxon in uncommonly sampled organisms increasingly difficult.

== History ==
=== Overview ===
The term "phylogeny" derives from the German Phylogenie, introduced by Haeckel in 1866, and the Darwinian approach to classification which became known as the "phyletic" approach. It can be traced back to Aristotle, who wrote in his Posterior Analytics, "We may assume the superiority ceteris paribus [other things being equal] of the demonstration which derives from fewer postulates or hypotheses."

=== Ernst Haeckel's recapitulation theory ===
The modern concept of phylogenetics evolved primarily as a disproof of a previously widely accepted theory. During the late 19th century, Ernst Haeckel's recapitulation theory, or "biogenetic fundamental law", was widely popular. It was often expressed as "ontogeny recapitulates phylogeny", i.e. the development of a single organism during its lifetime, from germ to adult, successively mirrors the adult stages of successive ancestors of the species to which it belongs. But this theory has long been rejected. Instead, ontogeny evolves – the phylogenetic history of a species cannot be read directly from its ontogeny, as Haeckel thought would be possible, but characters from ontogeny can be (and have been) used as data for phylogenetic analyses; the more closely related two species are, the more apomorphies their embryos share.

=== Timeline of key points ===
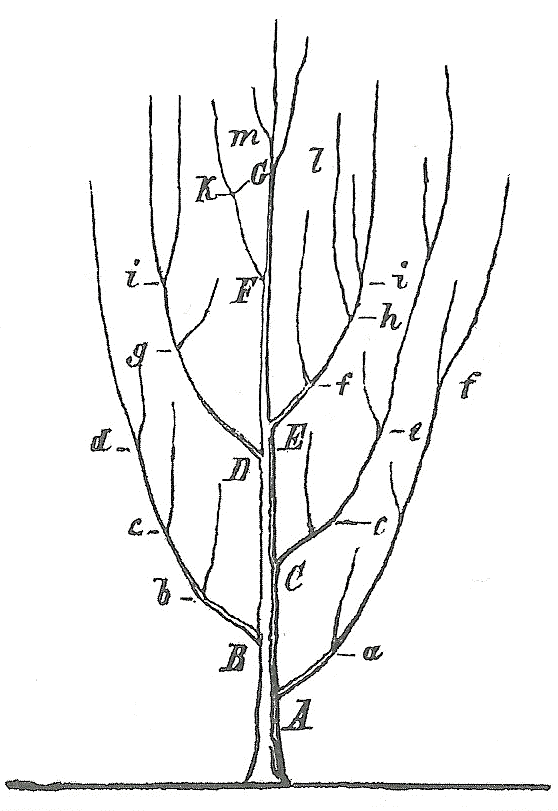
Branching tree diagram from Heinrich Georg Bronn's work (1858)

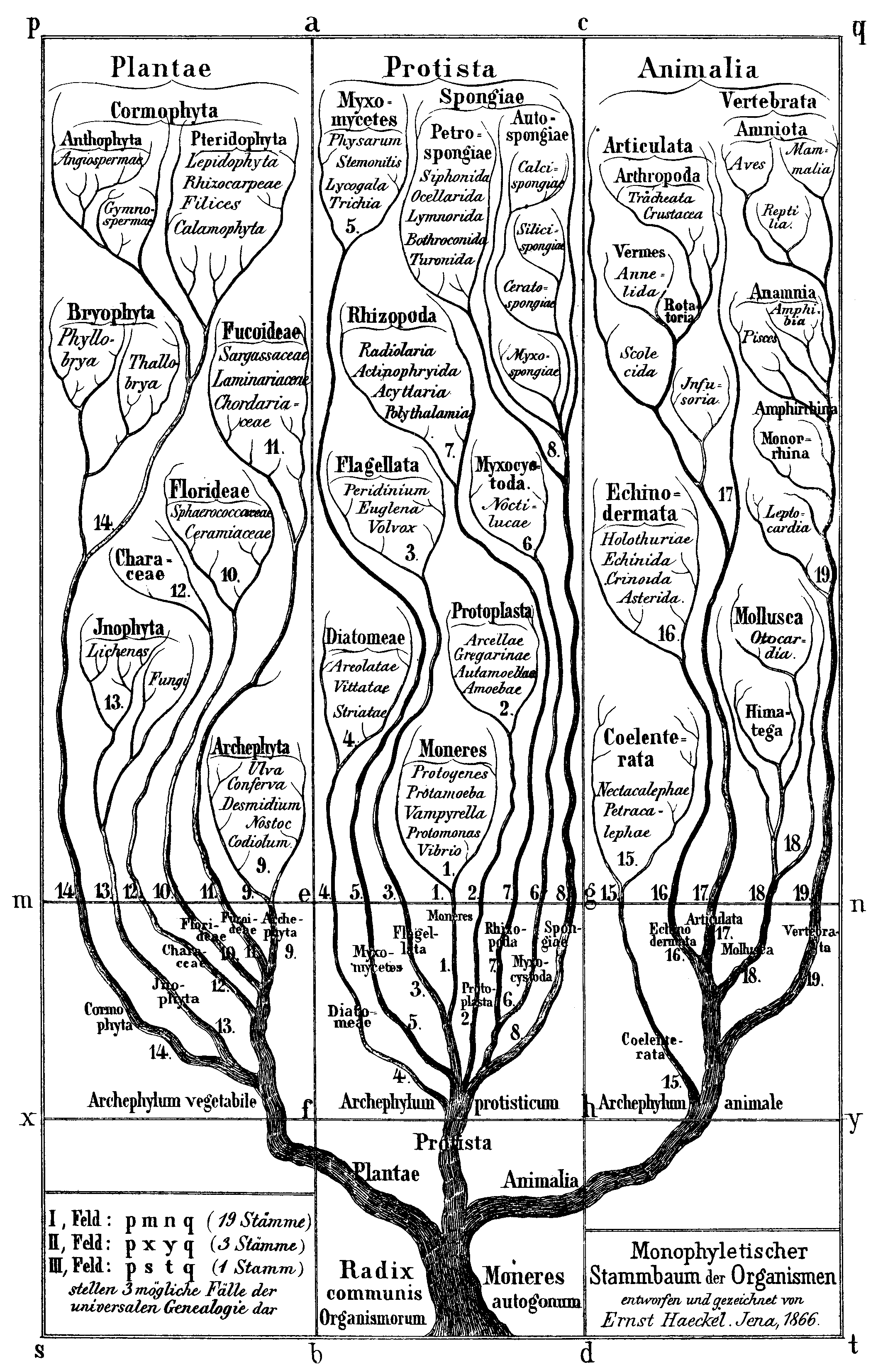
Phylogenetic tree suggested by Haeckel (1866)

- 14th century, lex parsimoniae (parsimony principle), William of Ockam, English philosopher, theologian, and Franciscan friar, but the idea actually goes back to Aristotle, as a precursor concept. He introduced the concept of Occam's razor, which is the problem solving principle that recommends searching for explanations constructed with the smallest possible set of elements. Though he did not use these exact words, the principle can be summarized as "Entities must not be multiplied beyond necessity." The principle advocates that when presented with competing hypotheses about the same prediction, one should prefer the one that requires fewest assumptions.
- 1763, Bayesian probability, Rev. Thomas Bayes, a precursor concept. Bayesian probability began a resurgence in the 1950s, allowing scientists in the computing field to pair traditional Bayesian statistics with other more modern techniques. It is now used as a blanket term for several related interpretations of probability as an amount of epistemic confidence.
- 18th century, Pierre Simon (Marquis de Laplace), perhaps first to use ML (maximum likelihood), precursor concept. His work gave way to the Laplace distribution, which can be directly linked to least absolute deviations.
- 1809, evolutionary theory, Philosophie Zoologique, Jean-Baptiste de Lamarck, precursor concept, foreshadowed in the 17th century and 18th century by Voltaire, Descartes, and Leibniz, with Leibniz even proposing evolutionary changes to account for observed gaps suggesting that many species had become extinct, others transformed, and different species that share common traits may have at one time been a single race, also foreshadowed by some early Greek philosophers such as Anaximander in the 6th century BC and the atomists of the 5th century BC, who proposed rudimentary theories of evolution
- 1837, Darwin's notebooks show an evolutionary tree
- 1840, American Geologist Edward Hitchcock published what is considered to be the first paleontological "Tree of Life". Many critiques, modifications, and explanations would follow.
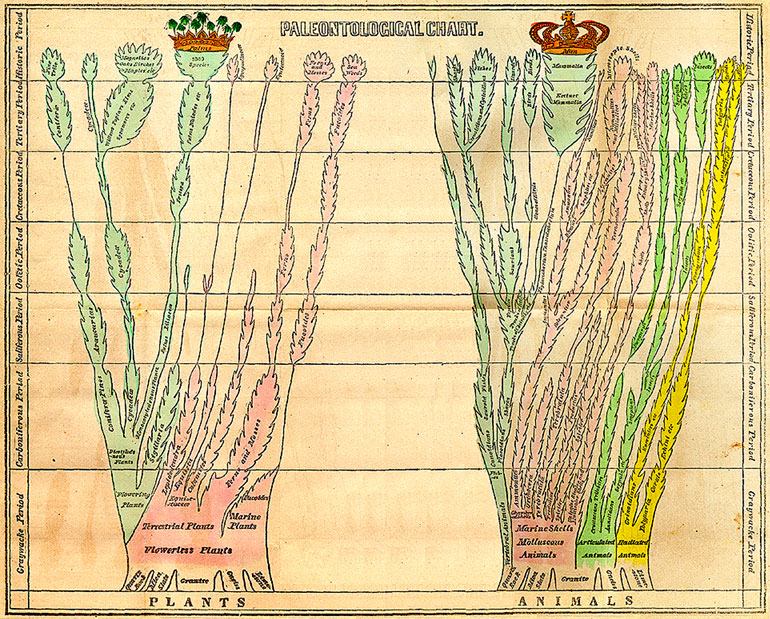
  This chart displays one of the first published attempts at a paleontological "Tree of Life" by Geologist Edward Hitchcock. (1840)
- 1843, distinction between homology and analogy (the latter now referred to as homoplasy), Richard Owen, precursor concept. Homology is the term used to characterize the similarity of features that can be parsimoniously explained by common ancestry. Homoplasy is the term used to describe a feature that has been gained or lost independently in separate lineages over the course of evolution.
- 1858, Paleontologist Heinrich Georg Bronn (1800–1862) published a hypothetical tree to illustrating the paleontological "arrival" of new, similar species. following the extinction of an older species. Bronn did not propose a mechanism responsible for such phenomena, precursor concept.
- 1858, elaboration of evolutionary theory, Darwin and Wallace, also in Origin of Species by Darwin the following year, precursor concept.
- 1866, Ernst Haeckel, first publishes his phylogeny-based evolutionary tree, precursor concept. Haeckel introduces the now-disproved recapitulation theory. He introduced the term "Cladus" as a taxonomic category just below subphylum.
- 1893, Dollo's Law of Character State Irreversibility, precursor concept. Dollo's Law of Irreversibility states that "an organism never comes back exactly to its previous state due to the indestructible nature of the past, it always retains some trace of the transitional stages through which it has passed."
- 1912, ML (maximum likelihood) recommended, analyzed, and popularized by Ronald Fisher, precursor concept. Fisher is one of the main contributors to the early 20th-century revival of Darwinism, and has been called the "greatest of Darwin's successors" for his contributions to the revision of the theory of evolution and his use of mathematics to combine Mendelian genetics and natural selection in the 20th century "modern synthesis".
- 1921, Tillyard uses term "phylogenetic" and distinguishes between archaic and specialized characters in his classification system.
- 1940, Lucien Cuénot coined the term "clade" in 1940: "terme nouveau de clade (du grec κλάδοςç, branche) [A new term clade (from the Greek word klados, meaning branch)]". He used it for evolutionary branching.
- 1947, Bernhard Rensch introduced the term Kladogenesis in his German book Neuere Probleme der Abstammungslehre Die transspezifische Evolution, translated into English in 1959 as Evolution Above the Species Level (still using the same spelling).
- 1949, Jackknife resampling, Maurice Quenouille (foreshadowed in '46 by Mahalanobis and extended in '58 by Tukey), precursor concept.
- 1950, Willi Hennig's classic formalization. Hennig is considered the founder of phylogenetic systematics, and published his first works in German of this year. He also asserted a version of the parsimony principle, stating that the presence of amorphous characters in different species 'is always reason for suspecting kinship, and that their origin by convergence should not be presumed a priori'. This has been considered a foundational view of phylogenetic inference.
- 1952, William Wagner's ground plan divergence method.
- 1957, Julian Huxley adopted Rensch's terminology as "cladogenesis" with a full definition: "Cladogenesis I have taken over directly from Rensch, to denote all splitting, from subspeciation through adaptive radiation to the divergence of phyla and kingdoms." With it he introduced the word "clades", defining it as: "Cladogenesis results in the formation of delimitable monophyletic units, which may be called clades."
- 1960, Arthur Cain and Geoffrey Ainsworth Harrison coined "cladistic" to mean evolutionary relationship,
- 1963, first attempt to use ML (maximum likelihood) for phylogenetics, Edwards and Cavalli-Sforza.
- 1965
  - Camin-Sokal parsimony, first parsimony (optimization) criterion and first computer program/algorithm for cladistic analysis both by Camin and Sokal.
  - Character compatibility method, also called clique analysis, introduced independently by Camin and Sokal (loc. cit.) and E. O. Wilson.
- 1966
  - English translation of Hennig.
  - "Cladistics" and "cladogram" coined (Webster's, loc. cit.)
- 1969
  - Dynamic and successive weighting, James Farris.
  - Wagner parsimony, Kluge and Farris.
  - CI (consistency index), Kluge and Farris.
  - Introduction of pairwise compatibility for clique analysis, Le Quesne.
- 1970, Wagner parsimony generalized by Farris.
- 1971
  - First successful application of ML (maximum likelihood) to phylogenetics (for protein sequences), Neyman.
  - Fitch parsimony, Walter M. Fitch. These gave way to the most basic ideas of maximum parsimony. Fitch is known for his work on reconstructing phylogenetic trees from protein and DNA sequences. His definition of orthologous sequences has been referenced in many research publications.
  - NNI (nearest neighbour interchange), first branch-swapping search strategy, developed independently by Robinson and Moore et al.
  - ME (minimum evolution), Kidd and Sgaramella-Zonta (it is unclear if this is the pairwise distance method or related to ML as Edwards and Cavalli-Sforza call ML "minimum evolution").
- 1972, Adams consensus, Adams.
- 1976, prefix system for ranks, Farris.
- 1977, Dollo parsimony, Farris.
- 1979
  - Nelson consensus, Nelson.
  - MAST (maximum agreement subtree)((GAS) greatest agreement subtree), a consensus method, Gordon.
  - Bootstrap, Bradley Efron, precursor concept.
- 1980, PHYLIP, first software package for phylogenetic analysis, Joseph Felsenstein. A free computational phylogenetics package of programs for inferring evolutionary trees (phylogenies). One such example tree created by PHYLIP, called a "drawgram", generates rooted trees. This image shown in the figure below shows the evolution of phylogenetic trees over time.
- 1981
  - Majority consensus, Margush and MacMorris.
  - Strict consensus, Sokal and Rohlf
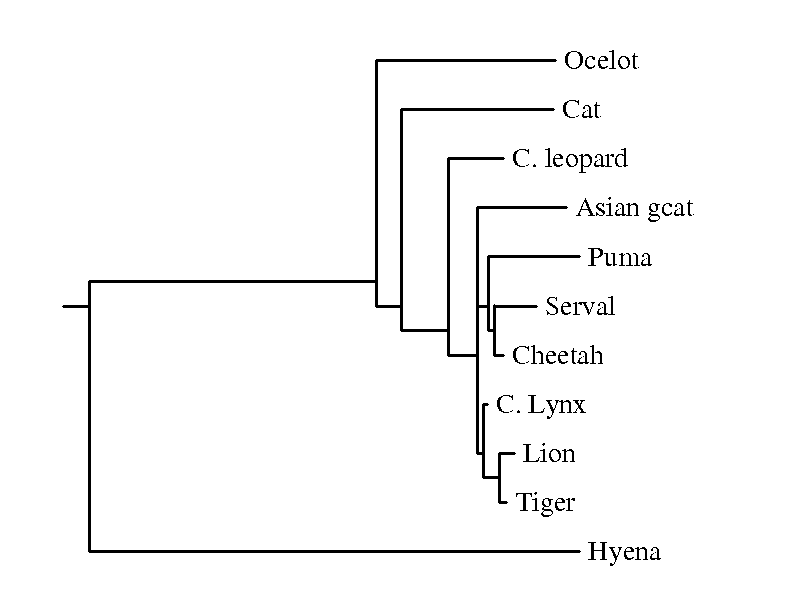
    This image depicts a PHYLIP generated drawgram. This drawgram is an example of one of the possible trees the software is capable of generating.
    first computationally efficient ML (maximum likelihood) algorithm. Felsenstein created the Felsenstein Maximum Likelihood method, used for the inference of phylogeny which evaluates a hypothesis about evolutionary history in terms of the probability that the proposed model and the hypothesized history would give rise to the observed data set.
- 1982
  - PHYSIS, Mikevich and Farris
  - Branch and bound, Hendy and Penny
- 1985
  - First cladistic analysis of eukaryotes based on combined phenotypic and genotypic evidence Diana Lipscomb.
  - First issue of Cladistics.
  - First phylogenetic application of bootstrap, Felsenstein.
  - First phylogenetic application of jackknife, Scott Lanyon.
- 1986, MacClade, Maddison and Maddison.
- 1987, neighbor-joining method Saitou and Nei
- 1988, Hennig86 (version 1.5), Farris
  - Bremer support (decay index), Bremer.
- 1989
  - RI (retention index), RCI (rescaled consistency index), Farris.
  - HER (homoplasy excess ratio), Archie.
- 1990
  - combinable components (semi-strict) consensus, Bremer.
  - SPR (subtree pruning and regrafting), TBR (tree bisection and reconnection), Swofford and Olsen.
- 1991
  - DDI (data decisiveness index), Goloboff.
  - First cladistic analysis of eukaryotes based only on phenotypic evidence, Lipscomb.
- 1993, implied weighting Goloboff.
- 1994, reduced consensus: RCC (reduced cladistic consensus) for rooted trees, Wilkinson.
- 1995, reduced consensus RPC (reduced partition consensus) for unrooted trees, Wilkinson.
- 1996, first working methods for BI (Bayesian Inference) independently developed by Li, Mau, and Rannala and Yang and all using MCMC (Markov chain-Monte Carlo).
- 1998, TNT (Tree Analysis Using New Technology), Goloboff, Farris, and Nixon.
- 1999, Winclada, Nixon.
- 2003, symmetrical resampling, Goloboff.
- 2004, 2005, similarity metric (using an approximation to Kolmogorov complexity) or NCD (normalized compression distance), Li et al., Cilibrasi and Vitanyi.
- 2017-2020, A dataset of homologous protein sequences with corresponding high-resolution crystal structures, enabling residue-level comparison of DSSP-assigned secondary-structure states and estimation of a 1-PAM secondary-structure transition matrix. The transition matrix enables maximum-likelihood structural phylogenetic tree inference and ancestral secondary-structure reconstruction for remote protein homologues.

== Uses of phylogenetic analysis ==
=== Pharmacology ===
One use of phylogenetic analysis involves the pharmacological examination of closely related groups of organisms. Advances in cladistics analysis through faster computer programs and improved molecular techniques have increased the precision of phylogenetic determination, allowing for the identification of species with pharmacological potential.

Historically, phylogenetic screens for pharmacological purposes were used in a basic manner, such as studying the Apocynaceae family of plants, which includes alkaloid-producing species like Catharanthus, known for producing vincristine, an antileukemia drug. Modern techniques now enable researchers to study close relatives of a species to uncover either a higher abundance of important bioactive compounds (e.g., species of Taxus for taxol) or natural variants of known pharmaceuticals (e.g., species of Catharanthus for different forms of vincristine or vinblastine).

=== Biodiversity ===
Phylogenetic analysis has also been applied to biodiversity studies within the fungi family. Phylogenetic analysis helps understand the evolutionary history of various groups of organisms, identify relationships between different species, and predict future evolutionary changes. Emerging imagery systems and new analysis techniques allow for the discovery of more genetic relationships in biodiverse fields, which can aid in conservation efforts by identifying rare species that could benefit ecosystems globally.

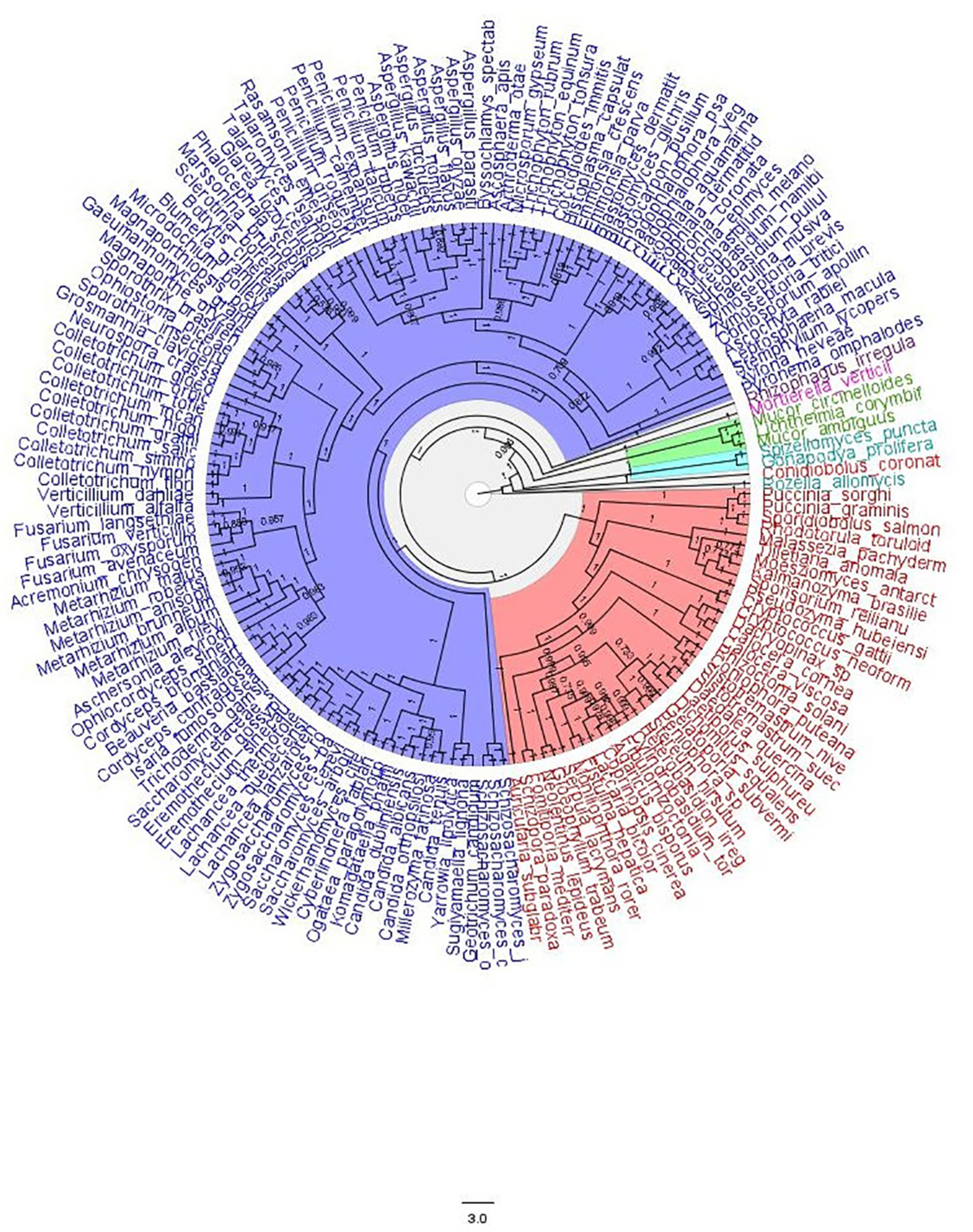
Phylogenetic Subtree of fungi containing different biodiverse sections of the fungi group.

=== Infectious disease epidemiology ===
Whole-genome sequence data from outbreaks or epidemics of infectious diseases can provide important insights into transmission dynamics and inform public health strategies. Traditionally, studies have combined genomic and epidemiological data to reconstruct transmission events. However, recent research has explored deducing transmission patterns solely from genomic data using phylodynamics, which involves analyzing the properties of pathogen phylogenies. Phylodynamics uses theoretical models to compare predicted branch lengths with actual branch lengths in phylogenies to infer transmission patterns. Additionally, coalescent theory, which describes probability distributions on trees based on population size, has been adapted for epidemiological purposes. Another source of information within phylogenies that has been explored is "tree shape." These approaches, while computationally intensive, have the potential to provide valuable insights into pathogen transmission dynamics.

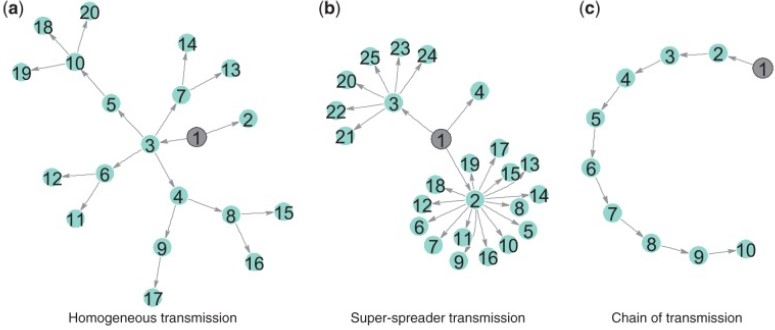
Pathogen Transmission Trees

The structure of the host contact network significantly impacts the dynamics of outbreaks, and management strategies rely on understanding these transmission patterns. Pathogen genomes spreading through different contact network structures, such as chains, homogeneous networks, or networks with super-spreaders, accumulate mutations in distinct patterns, resulting in noticeable differences in the shape of phylogenetic trees, as illustrated in Fig. 1. Researchers have analyzed the structural characteristics of phylogenetic trees generated from simulated bacterial genome evolution across multiple types of contact networks. By examining simple topological properties of these trees, researchers can classify them into chain-like, homogeneous, or super-spreading dynamics, revealing transmission patterns. These properties form the basis of a computational classifier used to analyze real-world outbreaks. Computational predictions of transmission dynamics for each outbreak often align with known epidemiological data.

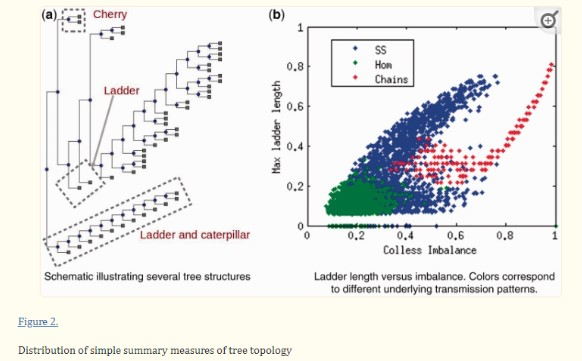
Graphical Representation of Phylogenetic Tree analysis

Different transmission networks result in quantitatively different tree shapes. To determine whether tree shapes captured information about underlying disease transmission patterns, researchers simulated the evolution of a bacterial genome over three types of outbreak contact networks—homogeneous, super-spreading, and chain-like. They summarized the resulting phylogenies with five metrics describing tree shape. Figures 2 and 3 illustrate the distributions of these metrics across the three types of outbreaks, revealing clear differences in tree topology depending on the underlying host contact network.

Super-spreader networks give rise to phylogenies with higher Colless imbalance, longer ladder patterns, lower Δw, and deeper trees than those from homogeneous contact networks. Trees from chain-like networks are less variable, deeper, more imbalanced, and narrower than those from other networks.

Scatter plots can be used to visualize the relationship between two variables in pathogen transmission analysis, such as the number of infected individuals and the time since infection. These plots can help identify trends and patterns, such as whether the spread of the pathogen is increasing or decreasing over time, and can highlight potential transmission routes or super-spreader events. Box plots displaying the range, median, quartiles, and potential outliers datasets can also be valuable for analyzing pathogen transmission data, helping to identify important features in the data distribution. They may be used to quickly identify differences or similarities in the transmission data.

=== Linguistic and cultural phylogenetics ===
==== Overview ====
Phylogenetic methods have been applied to systems outside biology, such as language and culture, where some researchers argue patterns of descent with modification may occur. The similarities observed between languages and between some cultural forms suggest they may have evolved in this way. Their pathway from possible common ancestry can be inferred using various phylogenetic tools to produce trees or networks most likely to represent the historical change that is being investigated

==== Languages ====
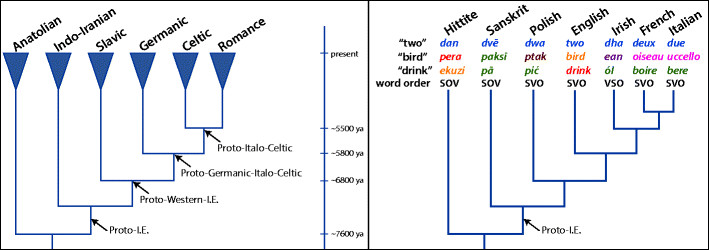
Phylogeny of Indo-European languages including estimated timeline and examples of linguistic analysis. Words of the same color are thought to be cognates

Languages are particularly amenable to phylogenetic inference. As with biological species, the observed similarities between them suggests descent from a common ancestor. When speech communities split and diverge from one another, changes in word forms and word ordering occur and new languages are gradually formed. Languages that split recently tend to show more similarities than those formed from more ancient splits. The similarities are called cognates. For example the English 'two' is cognate with the French 'deux', Sanskrit 'dvē' and Hindi 'do' which suggests these languages may share a common heritage and be part of the same Indo-European family. This analysis takes place across many cognates for many languages to build up a dataset for phylogenetic inference. Languages sharing larger numbers of cognates are generally inferred to be more closely related and those sharing fewer cognates more distantly related.

Phylogenetic methods are a component of quantitative comparative linguistics. As well as historical linguists, archaeologists and anthropologists specialising in prehistory have also drawn on those models. As language change is often linked to population dispersals they provide important insights into the history of population expansions. Trees can be calibrated using known historical events to estimate the timing of earlier population splits and the geographical pathways dispersals may have taken. Expansion timelines and migration pathways have been estimated for language families such as Indo-European, African Bantu, Austronesian and Australian Pama-Nyungan.

==== Culture ====
Some cultural forms may exhibit descent with modification characteristics and phylogenetic methods have been productively applied in cultural evolution studies. Examples include examining the histories of manuscripts, folk tales, rituals and material objects. In archaeology, phylogenetics has been applied to artefacts such as stone projectile point shapes and Bronze Age ceramics.

Comparative phylogenetic methods can also be used to test theories of cultural adaptation using a linguistic phylogeny to control for the effect of shared history. Examples include kinship and pastoralism, moralising high gods and political complexity and costly initiation rites.

==== Issues and Criticisms ====
Cultural and linguistic modifications are not always inherited vertically, from earlier iterations of the artefact or language. In some cases, changes might be transferred horizontally through diffusion such as by using loan words from neighbours. One way that is used by linguists to accommodate that is analysing words and grammar that tend to be more highly conserved.

Horizontal mixing between societies is an important issue in cultural phylogenetics. Cultural traits may be borrowed from neighbours because they are beneficial or novel. Repeated contact between societies may lead to a general drift towards similar cultural forms. Boyd et al, in their book chapter 'Are cultural phylogenies possible?' suggest the feasibility of phylogenetic reconstruction depends on the extent to which a cultural entity can resist horizontal mixing. Phylogenetic reconstruction may require the identification of separate stable packages within a cultural form and the determination of separate phylogenies for each package.

Two further issues are independent evolution and differences in evolutionary rates. A cultural trait may have been created independently, perhaps linked to environmental adaptation, leading to a false signal of ancestral similarity. In addition, some languages or cultural forms may evolve more rapidly that others leading to a misleading signal of distance from their ancestor in comparison to those evolving more slowly.

The production of datasets used to create phylogenies is not an exact science. Linguistic skill is required to identify cognates and there may be marginal cases. Cultural data is difficult to codify and accuracy is dependent on the knowledge of those interpreting the raw data e.g. ethnographic records. For both language and culture, bringing in contextual information from other sources can help to support the reliability of models. Modern computational methods also tend to be probabilistic in nature (see below) so the uncertainty of tree splits can be quantified. For cultural modelling, researchers often use a range of phylogenetic methods including those that produce visual outputs of uncertain (reticulated) relationships.

==== Methods and models ====
Bayesian phylogenetic methods apply Bayesian inference to generate phylogenies based on their likelihood of fitting the observed distribution of data. Examples are BEAST and MrBayes. These models are widely used in biological, linguistic and cultural phylogenetics because they provide an efficient way to search for possible trees together with the ability to model different evolutionary scenarios. A sample of trees is obtained that reflects the most likely trees but also uncertainty in the phylogeny. It can be represented by a majority-rules consensus tree, which includes clades that are supported in at least 50% of the tree sample.

Another computational approach uses a distance-based method. Distances between groups or taxa are measured as similarities of cognate or cultural trait presence. A neighbor joining algorithm is used to array groups in space and the number and length of lines between taxa gives a visual indication of possible phylogenetic histories. An example model is NeighbourNet which has been used to analyse conflicting signals of inheritance in both biological and cultural systems.

== See also ==
- Angiosperm Phylogeny Group
- Bauplan
- Bioinformatics
- Biomathematics
- Coalescent theory
- Cultural evolution
- Computational phylogenetics
- Cytonuclear discordance
- EDGE of Existence programme
- Evolutionary taxonomy
- Evolutionary anthropology
- Language family
- Historical linguistics
- Maximum parsimony
- Microbial phylogenetics
- Molecular evolution
- Molecular phylogeny
- Ontogeny
- PhyloCode
- Phylodynamics
- Phylogenesis
- Phylogenetic comparative methods
- Phylogenetic network
- Phylogenetic nomenclature
- Phylogenetic tree
- Phylogenetic tree viewers
- Phylogenetics software
- Phylogenomics
- Phylogeny (psychoanalysis)
- Phylogeography
- Structural phylogenetics
- Systematics

== Bibliography ==
- Schuh, Randall T.; Brower, Andrew V.Z. (2009). Biological Systematics: principles and applications (2nd ed.). Ithaca: Comstock Pub. Associates/Cornell University Press. ISBN 978-0-8014-4799-0. OCLC 312728177.
- Forster, Peter; Renfrew, Colin, eds. (2006). Phylogenetic Methods and the Prehistory of Languages. McDonald Institute Press, University of Cambridge. ISBN 978-1-902937-33-5. OCLC 69733654.
- Baum, David A.; Smith, Stacey D. (2013). Tree Thinking: an introduction to phylogenetic biology. Greenwood Village, CO: Roberts and Company. ISBN 978-1-936221-16-5. OCLC 767565978.
- Stuessy, Tod F. (2009). Plant Taxonomy: The Systematic Evaluation of Comparative Data. Columbia University Press. ISBN 978-0-231-14712-5.
