= Phylogenetic network =

Graph used to visualize evolutionary relationships, including reticulation events

A phylogenetic network is any graph used to visualize evolutionary relationships (either abstractly or explicitly) between nucleotide sequences, genes, chromosomes, genomes, or species. They are employed when reticulation events such as hybridization, horizontal gene transfer, recombination, or gene duplication and loss are believed to be involved. They differ from phylogenetic trees by the explicit modeling of richly linked networks, by means of the addition of hybrid nodes (nodes with two parents) instead of only tree nodes (a hierarchy of nodes, each with only one parent). Phylogenetic trees are a subset of phylogenetic networks. Phylogenetic networks can be inferred and visualised with software such as SplitsTree, the R-package, phangorn, and, more recently, Dendroscope. A standard format for representing phylogenetic networks is a variant of Newick format which is extended to support networks as well as trees.

Many kinds and subclasses of phylogenetic networks have been defined based on the biological phenomenon they represent or which data they are built from (hybridization networks, usually built from rooted trees, ancestral recombination graphs (ARGs) from binary sequences, median networks from a set of splits, optimal realizations and reticulograms from a distance matrix), or restrictions to get computationally tractable problems (galled trees, and their generalizations level-k phylogenetic networks, tree-child or tree-sibling phylogenetic networks).

== Microevolution ==
Phylogenetic trees also have trouble depicting microevolutionary events, for example the geographical distribution of muskrat or fish populations of a given species among river networks, because there is no species boundary to prevent gene flow between populations. Therefore, a more general phylogenetic network better depicts these situations.

== Rooted vs unrooted ==
Unrooted phylogenetic network
Let X be a set of taxa. An unrooted phylogenetic network N on X is any undirected graph whose leaves are bijectively labeled by the taxa in X.

A number of different types of unrooted phylogenetic networks are in use like split networks and quasi-median networks. In most cases, such networks only depict relations between taxa, without giving information about the evolutionary history. Although some methods produce unrooted networks that can be interpreted as undirected versions of rooted networks, which do represent a phylogeny.

Rooted phylogenetic network
Let X be a set of taxa. A rooted phylogenetic network N on X is a rooted directed acyclic graph where the set of leaves is bijectively labeled by the taxa in X.

Rooted phylogenetic networks, like rooted phylogenetic trees, give explicit representations of evolutionary history. This means that they visualize the order in which the species diverged (speciated), converged (hybridized), and transferred genetic material (horizontal gene transfer).

== Classes of networks ==
For computational purposes, studies often restrict their attention to classes of networks: subsets of all networks with certain properties. Although computational simplicity is the main goal, most of these classes have a biological justification as well. Some prominent classes currently used in the mathematical phylogenetics literature are tree-child networks, tree-based networks, and level-k networks

== Software to compute phylogenetic networks ==
- PhyloNet, A Java-based software package that builds phylogenetic networks taking ILS, HGT etc. into consideration.
- PhyloNetworks, a Julia package for the manipulation, visualization, inference of phylogenetic networks, and their use for trait evolution.
- Network, Free Phylogenetic Network Software. Network generates evolutionary trees and networks from genetic, linguistic, and other data.
- Phylogeny programs, some of which compute phylogenetic networks
- List of programs for phylogenetic network reconstruction, evaluation, visualization, etc.
- SplitsTree
- Dendroscope
- Network inferring on the T-REX server
- TCS, Phylogenetic networks from DNA sequences or nucleotide distances using statistical parsimony.
- NetTest, Characterization of phylogenetic networks.
- phangorn: Phylogenetic Reconstruction and Analysis
- SimPlot++ Sequence similarity network analysis.
