= Paul M. Sharp =

Scottish academic scientist (b.1957)

Paul Sharp FRS FRSE MRIA
- Born: Paul Martin Sharp; 12 September 1957 (age 68)
- Education: University of Edinburgh (BSc, PhD)
- Known for: CLUSTAL; Codon Adaptation Index
- Awards: EMBO Member (1992)
- Scientific career
- Fields: Evolutionary genetics; Viral evolution; Codon usage; HIV; Malaria
- Workplaces: University of Edinburgh; University of Nottingham; University of Dublin
- Thesis: Quantitative genetics of Drosophila melanogaster - variation in male mating ability (1982)
- Doctoral advisor: Alan Robertson
- Doctoral students: Kenneth H. Wolfe
- Other notable students: Desmond G. Higgins (postdoc)
- Website: www.research.ed.ac.uk/portal/en/persons/paul-sharp(ed91461c-d4f2-497d-8621-2ec9be212726).html

Paul Martin Sharp (born 1957) is a British bioinformatician who is a professor of genetics at the University of Edinburgh, where he holds the Alan Robertson chair of genetics in the Institute of Evolutionary Biology.

== Education ==
Sharp was educated at the University of Edinburgh where he was awarded a Bachelor of Science degree in 1979 followed by a PhD in 1982 for research using quantitative genetics on the fruit fly Drosophila melanogaster supervised by Alan Robertson.

== Career and research ==
Sharp has held academic posts at Trinity College, Dublin from 1982 to 1993, the University of Nottingham from 1993 to 2007 and was appointed Professor at the University of Edinburgh in 2007.

Sharp's research investigates the evolutionary origin of bacteria and viruses. He has carried out important work into the origin of HIV and its transmission from chimpanzees to humans. He also discovered that the human malaria parasite, Plasmodium, originated in gorillas. He was one of the first researchers to use DNA sequence databases to gain insight into evolutionary processes. His work amplifying DNA from chimpanzee faecal samples showed that HIV type 1 was transmitted to humans from a specific chimp population in West Africa in the early 20th century. Paul went on to examine his collection of ape faecal samples for plasmodium parasites, finding a likely candidate for the form that causes malaria in humans.

In the eighties, Sharp collaborated with Desmond G. Higgins during the creation of CLUSTAL, a suite of multiple sequence alignment programs that have become widely used and highly influential. His research has been funded by the Biotechnology and Biological Sciences Research Council (BBSRC). His former doctoral students include Kenneth H. Wolfe.

=== Awards and honours ===
Sharp was elected member of the European Molecular Biology Organization (EMBO) in 1992, and was President of the Society for Molecular Biology and Evolution. He was elected member of the Royal Irish Academy in 1993, a Fellow of the Royal Society of Edinburgh (FRSE) in 2010 and a Fellow of the Royal Society (FRS) in 2013.

In 2024 Sharp was awarded The Darwin Medal for his work addressing the origins and evolution of HIV and the malaria parasite Plasmodium.

== Personal life ==
Sharps's entry in Who's Who lists his recreations as hill walking, pteridology and, since 1967, supporting Nottingham Forest Football Club.
