= List of Copidosoma species =

This is a list of species within the chalcid wasp genus Copidosoma

== Copidosoma species ==
- Copidosoma abulense Mercet, 1921
- Copidosoma aeneum Sharkov, 1985
- Copidosoma aeripes (Girault, 1932)
- Copidosoma agrotis (Fonscolombe, 1832)
- Copidosoma aithyia (Walker, 1837)
- Copidosoma albipes (Westwood, 1837)
- Copidosoma alhagiae Myartseva, 1983
- Copidosoma amarginalia Li and Ma, 2007
- Copidosoma amurense Sharkov, 1988
- Copidosoma anceus (Walker, 1837)
- Copidosoma ancharus (Walker, 1837)
- Copidosoma aptera Japoshvili (unavailable name in current taxon)
- Copidosoma archeodominica Zuparko and Trjapitzin, 2014
- Copidosoma arenarium Erdos, 1961
- Copidosoma arenicola (Trjapitzin, 1967)
- Copidosoma aretas (Walker, 1838)
- Copidosoma arvense Myartseva, 1983
- Copidosoma athepi Guerrieri and Noyes, 2005
- Copidosoma augasmatis Trjapitzin, 1968
- Copidosoma auriceps (Ashmead, 1900)
- Copidosoma australia Girault, 1917
- Copidosoma australicum Girault, 1917
- Copidosoma australis Girault, 1917
- Copidosoma autumnale Myartseva, 1983
- Copidosoma babas (Walker, 1837)
- Copidosoma baii Zhang and Huang, 2007
- Copidosoma bakeri (Howard, 1898)
- Copidosoma balchanense Myartseva, 1983
- Copidosoma bicoloricornis (Girault, 1915)
- Copidosoma bohemicum (Hoffer, 1960)
- Copidosoma bolivari Mercet, 1921
- Copidosoma boreale Hoffer, 1970
- Copidosoma bouceki Kazmi and Hayat, 1998
- Copidosoma boucheanum Ratzeburg, 1844
- Copidosoma breviclava Hoffer, 1970
- Copidosoma brevitruncatellum Kazmi and Hayat, 1998
- Copidosoma breviusculum Hoffer, 1980
- Copidosoma bucculatricis (Howard, 1892)
- Copidosoma bucharicum Myartseva, 1983
- Copidosoma budense Erdos, 1955
- Copidosoma calligoni Myartseva, 1983
- Copidosoma caspicum Myartseva, 1983
- Copidosoma celaenae Howard, 1885
- Copidosoma cercobelus Ratzeburg (unavailable name in current taxon)
- Copidosoma cervius (Walker, 1846)
- Copidosoma chalconotum (Dalman, 1820)
- Copidosoma charon Guerrieri and Noyes, 2005
- Copidosoma chilense (Brethes, 1921)
- Copidosoma clavatum Myartseva, 1982
- Copidosoma coimbatorense Kazmi and Hayat, 1998
- Copidosoma compressiventris Girault, 1915
- Copidosoma coni (Trjapitzin, Voinovich and Sharkov, 1987)
- Copidosoma convexum Ishii, 1928
- Copidosoma cubense Lopez, 2003
- Copidosoma cuproviride Springate and Noyes, 1990
- Copidosoma cyaneum Hoffer, 1970
- Copidosoma dasi Hayat, 2003
- Copidosoma deceptor Miller, 1958
- Copidosoma delattrei (Ghesquiere, 1948)
- Copidosoma dendrophilum Myartseva, 1983
- Copidosoma desantisi Annecke and Mynhardt, 1974
- Copidosoma dioryctria Dang and Wang, 2002
- Copidosoma distinctum Szelenyi, 1982
- Copidosoma dius (Walker, 1837)
- Copidosoma dudichi Szelenyi, 1982
- Copidosoma dushakense Myartseva, 1983
- Copidosoma eucalypti (Dodd, 1917)
- Copidosoma eurystomum Kazmi and Hayat, 2012
- Copidosoma exiguum Kazmi and Hayat, 1998
- Copidosoma exortivum Sharkov, 1988
- Copidosoma extraneum (Hoffer, 1970)
- Copidosoma exvallis Noyes, 1988
- Copidosoma fadus (Walker, 1838)
- Copidosoma falkovitshi Myartseva, 1983
- Copidosoma farabense Myartseva, 1983
- Copidosoma fasciatum (Girault, 1913)
- Copidosoma filicorne (Dalman, 1820)
- Copidosoma firli Guerrieri and Noyes, 2005
- Copidosoma flagellare (Dalman, 1820)
- Copidosoma floridanum (Ashmead, 1900)
- Copidosoma fulgens Sharkov, 1985
- Copidosoma fuscisquama (Thomson, 1876)
- Copidosoma gelechiae Howard, 1885
- Copidosoma genale (Thomson, 1876)
- Copidosoma gibbosum Sharkov, 1988
- Copidosoma gloriosum (Mercet, 1917)
- Copidosoma gracile (Kaul and Agarwal, 1986)
- Copidosoma graminis Noyes, 1989
- Copidosoma hanzhongenum Dang and Wang, 2002
- Copidosoma heinitane Li and Wang, 2018
- Copidosoma herbaceum Mercet, 1921
- Copidosoma herbicola Sharkov, 1988
- Copidosoma hispanicum (Mercet, 1921)
- Copidosoma hofferi (Sharkov, 1985)
- Copidosoma horaxis Kazmi and Hayat, 1998
- Copidosoma howardi Zolnerowich and Zuparko, 2010
- Copidosoma howardi Zolnerowich and Zuparko, 2011
- Copidosoma hyalinistigma De Santis, 1964
- Copidosoma ilaman Kazmi and Hayat, 1998
- Copidosoma indicum Kazmi and Hayat, 1998
- Copidosoma insulare (Timberlake, 1941)
- Copidosoma intermedium Howard, 1885
- Copidosoma iole (Trjapitzin, 1967)
- Copidosoma ipswichia (Girault, 1923)
- Copidosoma iracundum Erdos, 1957
- Copidosoma iridescens Sharkov, 1985
- Copidosoma isfahani Japoshvili, 2016
- Copidosoma javense (Girault, 1919)
- Copidosoma jucundum Kazmi and Hayat, 1998
- Copidosoma juliae Myartseva, 1986
- Copidosoma katuniense (Litvinchuk and Trjapitzin, 1979)
- Copidosoma kirghizicum Myartseva, 1983
- Copidosoma koehleri Blanchard, 1940
- Copidosoma komabae (Ishii, 1923)
- Copidosoma kuhitangense Myartseva, 1983
- Copidosoma kushkense Myartseva, 1983
- Copidosoma lepidopterophagum (Girault, 1915)
- Copidosoma linzhiensis Li and Wang, 2018
- Copidosoma longchuane Li and Wang, 2018
- Copidosoma longiartus (Girault, 1932)
- Copidosoma longicaudata Japoshvili and Guerrieri, 2013
- Copidosoma longiclavatum Kazmi and Hayat, 1998
- Copidosoma longiventre Myartseva, 1983
- Copidosoma lotae (Girault, 1923)
- Copidosoma lucetius (Walker, 1839)
- Copidosoma lucidum Kazmi and Hayat, 1998
- Copidosoma luciphilum (Sharkov, 1985)
- Copidosoma lymani Howard, 1907
- Copidosoma malacosoma Dang and Wang, 2002
- Copidosoma manaliense Kazmi and Hayat, 1998
- Copidosoma manilae (Ashmead, 1904)
- Copidosoma melanocephalum Ashmead, 1886 (unavailable name in current taxon)
- Copidosoma melanocerum (Ashmead, 1900)
- Copidosoma meridionale (Kazmi and Hayat, 1998)
- Copidosoma minutum (Herthevtzian, 1979)
- Copidosoma mohelnense Hoffer, 1970
- Copidosoma monochroum Hoffer, 1970
- Copidosoma myartsevae Sharkov, 1988
- Copidosoma nacoleiae (Eady, 1960)
- Copidosoma naevia Saether, 1966
- Copidosoma naurzumense Sharkov, Katzner and Bragina, 2003
- Copidosoma nekrasovi Trjapitzin, 1998
- Copidosoma nepalense (Kazmi, 1997)
- Copidosoma nijasovi Myartseva, 1981
- Copidosoma nocturnum Sharkov, 1985
- Copidosoma notatum Kazmi and Hayat, 1998
- Copidosoma noyesi Kazmi and Hayat, 1998
- Copidosoma nubilosum Sharkov, 1988
- Copidosoma oreinos Kazmi and Hayat, 1998
- Copidosoma orientale (Yu and Zhang, 2010)
- Copidosoma ortyx Guerrieri and Noyes, 2005
- Copidosoma paralios (Sharkov, 1985)
- Copidosoma parkeri (Girault, 1932)
- Copidosoma perminutum (Girault, 1915)
- Copidosoma perpunctatum Szelenyi, 1982
- Copidosoma perseverans (Girault, 1915)
- Copidosoma peticus (Walker, 1846)
- Copidosoma phaloniae Zhang and Huang, 2007
- Copidosoma phthorimaeae Logvinovskaya, 1982
- Copidosoma pilosum Szelenyi, 1982
- Copidosoma pistacinellae Hoffer, 1970
- Copidosoma plethoricum (Caltagirone, 1966)
- Copidosoma primulum (Mercet, 1921)
- Copidosoma pyralidis (Ashmead, 1888)
- Copidosoma radnense Erdos, 1957
- Copidosoma rarum Kazmi and Hayat, 1998
- Copidosoma ratzeburgi Mercet, 1921
- Copidosoma recurvariae Sharkov, 1988
- Copidosoma remotum Sharkov, 1988
- Copidosoma salacon (Walker, 1839)
- Copidosoma sashegyense Erdos, 1957
- Copidosoma saxaulicum Myartseva, 1983
- Copidosoma scutellare (Hoffer, 1970)
- Copidosoma serricorne (Dalman, 1820)
- Copidosoma shakespearei Girault, 1923
- Copidosoma shawi Guerrieri and Noyes, 2005
- Copidosoma silvestrii (Costa Lima, 1953)
- Copidosoma sinevi Sharkov, 1988
- Copidosoma slavai Myartseva, 1983
- Copidosoma songinum (Hoffer, 1970)
- Copidosoma sosares (Walker, 1837)
- Copidosoma spinosum Kazmi and Hayat, 1998
- Copidosoma splendidum Foerster (unavailable name in current taxon)
- Copidosoma stylatum (Thomson, 1876)
- Copidosoma subalbicorne (Hoffer, 1960)
- Copidosoma tamilanum Kazmi and Hayat, 2014
- Copidosoma tanytmemum (Caltagirone, 1985)
- Copidosoma teciae (Blanchard, 1940)
- Copidosoma tenue Szelenyi, 1982
- Copidosoma terebrator Mayr, 1876
- Copidosoma thebe (Walker, 1838)
- Copidosoma thompsoni Mercet, 1925
- Copidosoma tibiale Hoffer, 1970
- Copidosoma transversum Kazmi and Hayat, 1998
- Copidosoma tremblayi Guerrieri and Noyes, 2006
- Copidosoma trisegmentis (Xu, 2000)
- Copidosoma trjapitzini Simutnik, 2007
- Copidosoma truncatellum (Dalman, 1820)
- Copidosoma tugaicum Myartseva, 1983
- Copidosoma turanicum Myartseva, 1983
- Copidosoma ultimum Sharkov, 1988
- Copidosoma uruguayensis Tachikawa, 1968
- Copidosoma uruguayensis Tachnikawa, 1968
- Copidosoma varicorne (Nees, 1834)
- Copidosoma variventris (Girault, 1925)
- Copidosoma venustum Sharkov, 1988
- Copidosoma vicinum (Herthevtzian, 1979)
- Copidosoma vinnulum Kazmi and Hayat, 1998
- Copidosoma virescens De Santis, 1972
- Copidosoma viridiaeneum Hoffer, 1970
- Copidosoma zdeneki Guerrieri and Noyes, 2005
- Copidosoma zolta Guerrieri and Noyes, 2005
