= CYP11C1 =

cytochrome P450, family 11, subfamily c, polypeptide 1

Identifiers
- Organism: Danio rerio
- Symbol: CYP11C1
- Entrez: 791124
- Orthologs: NCBI: entry; OMA: entry
- RefSeq (mRNA): NM_001080204.1
- RefSeq (Prot): NP_001073673.1
- UniProt: A1XRK1

Other data
- EC number: 1.14.15.4
- Chromosome: 16: 54.46 - 54.48 Mb
Search for
- Structures: Swiss-model
- Domains: InterPro

The Cyp11c1 is a fish gene encoding a CYP450 enzyme, which was originally found in Zebrafish (Danio rerio), this enzyme mainly catalyze the formation of cortisol and 11-Ketotestosterone (11-KT). 11-KT is the endogenous androgen in zebrafish. CYP11C is the orthologous to CYP11B, tetrapod's CYP11B1 evolved from CYP11C1 of fish, and CYP11B/11C are the ohnologues to CYP11A, which duplicated during 2R event.
