= MRAP (disambiguation) =

MRAP (Mine Resistant Ambush Protected vehicle) is a type of armored fighting vehicle.

MRAP may also refer to:

- MRAP (French NGO), Mouvement contre le racisme et pour l'amitié entre les peuples (Movement Against Racism and for Friendship between Peoples), a French anti-racism NGO
- Melanocortin 2 receptor accessory protein
