= Copidosoma =

- Copidosoma floridanum

Scientific classification
- Kingdom: Animalia
- Phylum: Arthropoda
- Clade: Pancrustacea
- Class: Insecta
- Order: Hymenoptera
- Family: Encyrtidae
- Subfamily: Encyrtinae
- Genus: Copidosoma; Ratzeburg, 1844

Type species
- Copidosma boucheanum Ratzeburg, 1844

Species
- 209 (see text for notable examples)

Synonyms
- Berecyntus Howard, 1898; Litomastix Thomson, 1876; Paralitomastix Mercet, 1921; Copidosomopsis Girault, 1915

Genus of wasps

Copidosoma is a genus of chalcid wasps, which are parasitoids of Lepidoptera. The wasps are polyembryonic, depositing one or two eggs into their host which then develop into multiple offspring and have a soldier caste and a reproductive caste.

== Species and biology ==
Copidosoma has over 200 species, according to the Natural History Museum of London's Universal Chalcidoidea Database. Among these is Copidosoma floridanum, known for having the largest recorded brood of any parasitoidal insect, at 3,055 individuals, and for having its genome sequenced by the Human Genome Sequencing Center as part of the i5K project.

They are mainly polyembryonic parasitoids of the caterpillars of Lepidoptera and have been deliberately introduced into many areas as biological control agents for agricultural pests, e.g. Copidosoma floridanum was introduced to Hawaii to control the tomato looper (Chrysodeixis chalcites) while Copidosoma koehleri is used extensively in control of the potato tuber moth (Phthorimaea operculella) and Copidosoma primulum has been used in China to control the cotton bollworm (Helicoverpa armigera) in wheat crops.

The wasps of the genus Copidosoma are also of interest because they are polyembryonic, i.e. more than one embryo can be found in a single egg, and they have developed a caste system where an embryo can develop into a reproductive adult or a soldier caste. The wasp lays its egg into the host moth's egg and after the caterpillar hatches it undergoes a number of instar stages until it reaches its final instar and during this time the wasp's egg produces as many as 3000 embryos through cloning, these form an assemblage called a polymorula and live as endoparasitoids in the host.

In a study on C. floridanum 24% of the members in the polymorula, of either sex, develop in to soldiers and when the host is killed in its final instar these soldiers die too while their siblings consume the host and pupate to emerge as adults around two weeks later. Like other Hymenoptera the females are produced from fertilised eggs and the males from unfertilised eggs, female eggs produce a higher number of soldiers throughout development while male eggs produce fewer and only in the later stages of the cycle. Where there is more than one brood, where more than one egg has been laid in a host the soldier caste from the first female brood will kill all any larvae from subsequent eggs laid, except that if a male brood is older and from a different mother then the females will co-exist with the males. It appears that the early emerging female soldiers purpose is inter-specific competition, they ensure that the first female brood has the host to themselves by killing other non related and females and related and younger males, while the later soldiers are produced to defend the host from intra-specific competitors and are produced by both sexes, although male soldiers of C. floridanum lack aggression and their production may be a trait which is being selected against.

Most species of this genus are quite host specific and use a few species of moth as their hosts and phylogenetic analysis indicates that the more closely related the species of wasp are to one another the more similar the species of host selected tend to be. For example the wasps of the species group named after Copidosoma cervius are all parasitoids of moths in the family Geometridae while those in the nacoliae species group attack caterpillars of the families Pyralidae and Tortricidae.

=== Others of note ===
- Copidosoma thebe (Walker, 1838) senior synonym of Litomastix claviger Mercet, 1921

== Species ==
List of Copidosoma species
