= Melanocortin 2 receptor accessory protein =

Protein-coding gene in the species Homo sapiens

MRAP

Identifiers
- Aliases: MRAP, B27, C21orf61, FALP, FGD2, GCCD2, melanocortin 2 receptor accessory protein
- External IDs: OMIM: 609196; MGI: 1924287; GeneCards: MRAP

Gene location (Human)
Chr.	Chromosome 21 (human)
Band	21q22.11	Start	32,291,813 bp
Band	21q22.11	End	32,314,784 bp
RNA expression pattern
Bgee	Human / Mouse (ortholog); Top expressed in: right adrenal gland; right adrenal cortex; left adrenal gland; left adrenal cortex; adipose tissue; abdominal fat; testicle; subcutaneous adipose tissue; gonad; lactiferous gland / n/a; More reference expression data
BioGPS	n/a
Gene ontology
Molecular function	type 3 melanocortin receptor binding; protein binding; type 1 melanocortin receptor binding; corticotropin hormone receptor binding; type 4 melanocortin receptor binding; type 5 melanocortin receptor binding; identical protein binding
Cellular component	integral component of membrane; plasma membrane; endoplasmic reticulum membrane; endoplasmic reticulum; membrane
Biological process	protein localization to plasma membrane; positive regulation of adenylate cyclase-activating G protein-coupled receptor signaling pathway; negative regulation of adenylate cyclase-activating G protein-coupled receptor signaling pathway; negative regulation of protein localization to plasma membrane
Sources:Amigo / QuickGO
Orthologs
Databases	NCBI: entry; OMA: entry
Species	Human	Mouse
Entrez	56246	77037
Ensembl	ENSG00000170262	ENSMUSG00000039956
UniProt	Q8TCY5	Q9D159
RefSeq (mRNA)	NM_001285394; NM_178817; NM_206898; NM_001379228	NM_029844
RefSeq (protein)	NP_001272323; NP_848932; NP_996781; NP_001366157	NP_084120
Location (UCSC)	Chr 21: 32.29 – 32.31 Mb	n/a
PubMed search
- Wikidata
View/Edit Human	View/Edit Mouse

Melanocortin 2 receptor accessory protein is a transmembrane accessory protein that in humans is encoded by the MRAP gene located in chromosome 21q22.11. Alternate splicing of the MRAP mRNA generates two functionally isoforms MRAP-α and MRAP-β.

MRAP is an accessory protein to a family of five receptors called the melanocortin receptors (MC_{1-5}). It was previously known as fat tissue-specific low molecular weight protein (Falp). MRAP was thought to be involved in adipocytes differentiation. MRAP assists in the transport of the melanocortin 2 receptor to the cell membrane from the endoplasmic reticulum and assist in the generation of cAMP by the activated receptor. MRAP is also considered essential for the trafficking of MC_{2} to the cell surface and facilitate the MC_{2} response to adrenocorticotropic hormone (ACTH) in the adrenal gland leading to stimulation of glucocorticoid synthesis.

Human MRAP is found mainly in the adrenal gland and adipose tissue. It was also located in the brain, heart, ovary, testes, and breast. Genetic variants of MRAP are linked to an autosomal recessive condition called Familial Glucocorticoid Deficiency type 2 (FGD-2).

== Structure and functional domains ==
The cytogenetic location of MRAP gene is 21q22.11 and is composed of 6 exons that encodes a single-pass transmembrane protein. The protein is made of three domains: a transmembrane domain that is responsible for the attachment of the MRAP molecule in the cell membrane and facilitates the interaction with the receptor. The second domain assists MRAP expression on the cell membrane as well as the expression of MC_{2}. The third and final domain that is near the amino- (N-) terminal enables the homodimerization of MRAP molecules. The N-terminal and the transmembrane domains are highly conserved between species. In contrast, the carboxyl-(C-) terminal is found to be diverging between the MRAP isoforms and also between different species. That said, the whole genome of human MRAP shares lower similarity with mouse Mrap, and that is mainly in the N-terminal and transmembrane domain.

The alternate splicing of the MRAP mRNA generates 4 isoforms: two functional isoforms which are MRAP-α (173 amino acids); MRAP-β (102 amino acids); non-functional isoforms, isoform 3 (113 amino acids); and isoform 4 (172 amino acids). MRAP, and its ortholog MRAP2, is the dual topology where either the C- or the N- terminal is oriented extracellularly. This dual topology feature was revealed using epitope immunoprecipitation and live cell imaging studies. MRAP is partially glycosylated and this is dependent on the N-terminal being facing the luminal surface of the endoplasmic reticulum. This unique feature enables MRAP to form an antiparallel homodimer that is essential for the MRAP interaction with the melanocortin receptors.

The expression of MRAP was found to be regulated by ACTH as well as lipopolysaccharides and, in rats, is affected by diurnal variation. Phylogenetic studies revealed the existence of MRAP orthologs in different piscine species such as zebrafish and tetrapod and has also been detected in mammals and chicken. MRAP is thought to be originated as a result of R2 genome duplication event.

== Cellular activity ==
MRAP was found to mainly regulate the surface expression and signalling of MC_{2}. Cell surface ELISA and Immunofluorescence studies showed the co-expression of MC_{2}/MRAP in endoplasmic reticulum (ER) and also on the cell membrane, which indicates that MC_{2} needs MRAP to reach the cell membrane. In addition to cell trafficking, in vitro studies conducted on HEK293 cell revealed that MRAP enhances MC_{2} response to ACTH stimulation and the effect of MRAP-β was more pronounced than that of MRAP-α. The activated MC_{2} activates cAMP production which, in turn, stimulates the protein kinase A (PKA) pathway leading to glucocorticoid synthesis in the adrenal gland. In fat cells, where MC_{2} is expressed, MRAP was found to facilitate MC_{2} activated lipolysis and therefore regulating energy expenditure. The transmembrane domain of MRAP mediates MRAP/MC_{2} interaction, and that suggests an interaction with the transmembrane domain of one of the seven domains of MC_{2}. Once the interaction is established, MRAP uses its tyrosine-rich region to escort MC_{2} to the cell membrane. However, MRAP needs to be in the antiparallel homodimer status. The MC_{2}/MRAP complex expression on the cell membrane culminates in MRAP assisting MC_{2} to respond to ACTH stimulation, and that is through the same MRAP tyrosine rich area mentioned earlier.

In addition to regulating MC_{2} surface expression and signalling, MRAP was found to modulate the function of the other melanocortin receptors. Immunoprecipitation assays reported the interaction of MRAP with MC_{4}and MC_{5} and had no effect on the surface expression of MC_{1} and MC_{3}. Unlike MC_{2}, MRAP is not essential for these receptors as they were located on the cell surface in the absence of MRAP1. The interaction between MCs and MRAP was found to reduce the former response to the melanocortin synthetic ligand NDP-MSH

== Familial glucocorticoid deficiency (FGD) ==
The familial glucocorticoid deficiency occurs as a result of poor adrenal response to ACTH stimulation which leads to glucocorticoid deficiency. The mutations in the MRAP gene caused the congenital disorder familial glucocorticoid deficiency type 2 (FGD-2). FGD-2 is an autosomal recessive disease with early childhood onset of recurrent infections, hypoglycaemia, skin hyperpigmentation, and failure to thrive due to low glucocorticoids levels. If left untreated, it could be fatal. MRAP mutations were found to disable the movement of MC_{2} to the cell surface of adrenal gland cells; this would make MC_{2} irresponsive to ACTH stimulation causing a deficiency in glucocorticoids production. The mutations in the MRAP gene were found to be mostly homozygous nonsense or splice-site mutations that caused the truncation of MRAP protein. Few FGD-2 cases were reported to have homozygous missense MRAP gene mutations that led to replacing tyrosine with asparagine at position 59 or the substitution of valine with alanine at position 26. These missense mutations cause a milder form of the disease and a later onset. The mutations in the MRAP gene sequence that cause FGD-2 are considered rare compared to the effect of chronic corticosteroid treatment that leads to adrenal insufficiency disrupting the MC_{2}/MRAP stimulation by ACTH.

The adrenal cortex is made of three zones: zona glomerulosa, zona fasciculata and zona reticularis. The main zone that expresses MC_{2} and MRAP is the zona fasciculata. Both proteins are also found in the undifferentiated region of the adrenal gland, where there is a small population of adrenal stem cells The use of MRAP knockout transgenic mice revealed under-developed adrenal gland with loss of the adrenal zonation, which indicates another mechanism for FGD-2.

There is still no profound evidence of the involvement of MRAP in disorders beyond the adrenal gland. However, MC_{2} lipolytic activity was disturbed in the adipose tissue in the presence of mutated MRAP. Nevertheless, the MRAP mutations that caused FGD-2 did not seem to affect fat metabolism in the affected patients. This might indicate a compensatory mechanism to the loss of MRAP function in adipocytes.

The presence of MRAP in regions with no or low MC_{2} levels might indicate a role of MRAP beyond MC_{2} and the other melanocortin receptors. Ongoing studies using transgenic mice and array genotyping could give insight into the physiological processes involving MRAP.
