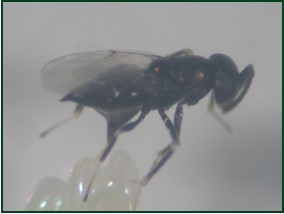

Scientific classification
- Kingdom: Animalia
- Phylum: Arthropoda
- Class: Insecta
- Order: Hymenoptera
- Family: Encyrtidae
- Genus: Copidosoma
- Species: C. koehleri

Binomial name
- Copidosoma koehleri Blanchard, 1940

= Copidosoma koehleri =

Species of insect

Copidosoma koehleri belongs to the family Encyrtidae and genus Copidosoma within the order Hymenoptera. It is a parasitoid and its hosts are mainly potato tuber moth (Phthorimaea operculella) but it also infest Andean potato tuber moth (Symmetrischema tangolias), Guatemalan potato tuber moth (Tecia solanivora) and Tomato leafminer (Tuta absoluta). Super-parasitism is associated with C. koehleri.

== Morphology ==
Adults measure between 1.1–1.4 mm and their middle legs are enlarged which is mainly used for jumping. They have short hairs which cover their wings. Female are different compared to males as the females have antennae which are long and slender with 3 segmented oval clava. Males have short antennae with 7 segments. They have a dark head and thorax with a metallic green sheen.

== Distribution ==
The polyembryonic encryrtid Copidosoma koehleri Blanchard naturally inhabits South America, specifically in regions spanning Brazil, Argentina, and Chile. They originate from regions including: Peru, Uruguay, Ecuador, and Bolivia. They were also introduced to some regions including: Australia (including Tasmania), Cyprus, Kenya, India, Mauritius, USA (California), South Africa, St. Helena, Zimbabwe, and Zambia.

== Development stages ==
=== Egg ===
The egg structure in Copidosoma koehleri resembles a dumbbell, comprising a bulb, neck, and a larger base, measuring around 0.17 mm in total length. Up to 40 embryos can emerge from a single fertilised egg in C. koehleri. These embryos differentiate into two distinct forms: one matures into an adult while the other transforms into a soldier, tasked with eliminating other parasitoid species within the host. Unfertilised eggs in C. koehleri naturally develop into male individuals.

=== Larva ===
The juvenile larvae have no colour but they change colour after feeding on the host tissue where they become creamy-white opaque. They completely feed on the host while developing into a pupa. The host body acts as a habitat in order for the larvae to develop. The cream-white larvae feed on the host ventricles and they change from creamy-white to orange. The host body then surrounds the parasitoids and then they emerge. This occurs around the twelfth day where the larvae reach maturity and depart from the tubers to undergo pupation.

=== Pupa ===
As larval development finishes, the larva produces a cocoon sheath for pupation. Initially, the pupa appears entirely white, but within approximately 24 hours, a brick-red pigmentation colours the eyes. Subsequently, melanization starts, with the abdominal tergites being the initial structures to darken and turn black. Pupation typically takes place around the fourteenth day, and the emergence of adult moths happens approximately on the twentieth day.

== Host choice ==
Selecting the right habitat could significantly impact an individual's survival, foraging abilities, and reproductive success. The quality of the host directly influences the survival, developmental rate, and size of offspring upon emergence. Consequently, C. koehleri frequently make adaptive choices regarding hosts based on their species, size, and developmental stage. Moreover, females frequently refrain from depositing eggs in hosts that have been parasitised before. They tend to avoid hosts previously parasitised by themselves more than those parasitised by other members of their species. This behavior likely diminishes competition among siblings, as the avoidance of self super-parasitism is favoured.

== Polyembryony ==
Polyembryony is an exceptional developmental process that occurs in C. koehleri. Another remarkable aspect of polyembryonic encyrtids involves the creation of a soldier caste. Within the clonal division process, a portion of embryos transforms into sterile soldier larvae. These soldiers engage in combat against competitors within the host but never reach maturity or emerge from the host.

== As a pest control ==
The encyrtid polyembryonic parasitoid, C.koehleri, has been effectively introduced to facilitate the biological control of moths in potato fields across South Africa and Australia. They are effective in the control of the potato tuber moth. Female wasps deposit their eggs inside potato tuber moth eggs, with each egg undergoing multiple divisions to create a cluster of 50 genetically identical embryos. Meanwhile, the host moth progresses through 4 larval instars.

Copidosoma koehleri displays numerous characteristics that are deemed beneficial for biological control agents, including high host specificity, high reproductive rate and targeting hosts at an early stage in its life cycle. In Zimbabwe, classical biological control showed significant success. Upon its implementation in Australia, it began to hold a vital role in controlling P. operculella, particularly following the introduction of a potato integrated pest management program that reduced the necessity for frequent pesticide applications. However, they do not are not efficient in controlling potato tuber moth in stored potatoes.
