= Protein music =

Protein music or, more broadly, genetic music (including DNA music) is a musical technique where music is composed by converting protein sequences or DNA sequences to musical notes. The earliest published references to genetic music in the scientific literature include a short correspondence by Hayashi and Munakata in Nature in 1984, a publication by geneticist Susumu Ohno and Midori Ohno (his wife and a musician) in Immunogenetics, and a paper in the journal Bioinformatics (then called Computer Applications in the Biosciences) co-authored by Ross D. King and Colin Angus (a member of the British psychedelic band The Shamen) in 1996,

Shortly before the King and Angus publication the French physicist and composer Joël Sternheimer (a singer also known by his stage name, Évariste) applied for a patent to use protein music to affect protein synthesis. The idea that music can affect protein synthesis is generally viewed as pseudoscientific by the molecular biology community, although the methods proposed by Sternheimer form the basis for software called Proteodyne. Applications for genetic music proposed in the scientific literature include aids to memorization and education.

== Theory ==
The idea that genes and music exhibit similarities was noted even earlier than the scientific publications in the area by Douglas Hofstadter in Gödel, Escher, Bach. Hofstadter even proposes that meaning is constructed in protein and in music.

The ideas that supports the possibility of creating harmonic musics using this method are:

- The repetition process governs both the musical composition and the DNA sequence construction.
- The conformations and energetics of the protein secondary and tertiary structures at the atomic level. See also for full compositions made using this concept.
- Pink noise (the correlation structure "1/f spectra") have been found in both musical signals and DNA sequences.
- Models with duplication and mutation operations, such as the "expansion-modification model" are able to generate sequences with 1/f spectra.
- When DNA sequences are converted to music, it sounds musical.
- Human Genome Project has revealed similar genetic themes not only between species, but also between proteins.

Musical renditions of DNA and proteins is not only a music composition method, but also a technique for studying genetic sequences. Music is a way of representing sequential relationships in a type of informational string to which the human ear is keenly attuned. The analytic and educational potential of using music to represent genetic patterns has been recognized from secondary school to university level.

== Susumu Ohno and DNA music ==
Susumu Ohno, one of the referents in the development of protein music, proposed in the early 80s that repetition is a fundamental to the evolution of proteins. This idea was fundamental to his notion that the repetition in biological sequences would have parallels in music composition, leading Ohno to state that the "...all-pervasive principle of repetitious recurrence governs not only coding sequence construction but also human endeavor in musical composition."

By implementing the concept of musical transformation in DNA sequences, and changing the fragments into musical scores, researchers are allowed to explore the repetitions in the sequences in terms of musical periodicities. The approach consists of assigning musical notes to nucleotide sequences, unveiling hidden patterns of relationship within genetic coding. Music and DNA share similarities in their structure by exhibiting repeating units and motifs.

== Musical Patterns ==
Periodicities and the principle of repetitious recurrences govern many aspects of life on this earth, including musical compositions and coding base sequences in genomes. This inherent similarity resulted in the effort to interconvert the two. One of music's uses, from its creation by the primitive Homo sapiens to the modern day, is as a time-keeping device. In Ohno's rendition, a space and a line on the octave scale are assigned to each base, A, G, T, and C. His work compares and identifies parallels in genomic sequences and notable music from the early Baroque and Romantic periods. Beyond the parallels that can be found rhythmically in music and peptide sequences, musical patterns can be a valuable tool for identifying sequence patterns of interest. For example, work done by Robert P. Bywater and Jonathan N. Middleton has used melody generation software to identify protein folds from sequence data.

== Periodicities in genes and proteins ==
Given the importance of repetition in music it is logical to assume that deviations from purely random patterns are likely to be necessary to produce aesthetically pleasing sonic patterns. Indeed, the idea that repetition is key in the formation of functional proteins was central to Ohno's early work in the area of genetic music. The question of randomness in protein sequences has received substantial attention, with early work suggesting that protein sequences are effectively random (at least when viewed at the scale of proteomes). However, subsequent work suggests the existence of statistically important regularities in protein sequences and experimental work has shown that periodicities can play a role in the origin of ordered proteins. Presumably, these periodicities are responsible for the aesthetically pleasing nature of music based on at least some proteins.

Ohno suggested that one important deviation from randomness is palindromic amino acid sequences ("peptide palindromes") in DNA-binding proteins, such as the H1 histone. Another example of these periodic sequences are the dipeptidic repeats found in the per locus coding sequences in Drosophila melanogaster have been found in the mouse as well. Ohno argues that the coding sequences behave periodically not merely as unique products of pure randomness and understanding this is a key feature to unraveling the complexity behind the genetic information challenging the notion of randomness in biological processes and comparing it more proximate with music. Although peptide palindromes are important deviations from randomness, they are distinct from palindromic sequences in nucleic acids, which are sequences that read identically to the sequence in the same direction on complementary strands. Peptide palindromes, as defined by Ohno, are actually much more similar to palindromes in other contexts. For example, the mouse H1 histone palindrome highlighted by Ohno is KAVKPKAAKPKVAK (letters correspond to the standard one-letter amino acid codes); note that this sequence simply reads identically when written forwards or backwards and is unrelated to nucleic acid complementarity. Large-scale surveys of peptide palindromes indicate that they are present in many proteins but they are not necessarily associated with any specific protein structures. The relationship between peptide palindromes and protein music has not been studied at a large scale.

== Practice ==
- Examples of simple protein structures converted to midi music file show the independence of protein music from musical instrument, and the convenience of using protein structures in music composition.
- The software Algorithmic arts can convert raw genetic data (freely available for download on the web) to music. There are many examples of musics generated by this software, both by designer and by others.
- Several people have composed musics using protein structure, and several students and professors have used music as a method to study proteins. The recording Sounds of HIV is a musical adaptation of the genetic material of HIV/AIDS.
- In 2023, Aditi Kantipuly, a physician, further expanded the scope of "genetic music" through her collaboration with professor of music, Stephen Taylor at the University of Illinois. Their collaboration culminated in the comprehensive "sonic catalog of rare diseases," an extensive project that transforms genetic data from over 230 rare conditions into a musical composition. These conditions were drawn from a study that estimated the economic burden of rare diseases on the U.S. economy to exceed $1 trillion annually. The project maps different disease categories to the concept of Indian chakras to establish underlying harmonic structures, while using the DNA promoter sequences of implicated genes from each specific disease, creating an innovative auditory representation of rare diseases.
- Ethnomusicologist and professor of music at the University of Alberta, Michael Frishkopf, partnered with physician, Aditi Kantipuly to create "Jakob's Melody," a composition designed to raise awareness for the rare genetic condition Severe Combined Immunodeficiency (SCID). This piece translates the genetic sequence of the ADA gene into musical tones, with lyrics penned by Jakob's mother. The song, released early in 2025, highlights the journey of Jakob, who was born with SCID and was one of the first in the world to undergo pioneering gene therapy for the condition at UCLA.
