= Copidosoma floridanum =

Scientific classification
- Kingdom: Animalia
- Phylum: Arthropoda
- Class: Insecta
- Order: Hymenoptera
- Family: Encyrtidae
- Genus: Copidosoma
- Species: C. floridanum

Binomial name
- Copidosoma floridanum Ashmead, 1900

Synonyms
- List: Berecyntus floridanus Ashmead, 1900; Copidosoma brethesi (Blanchard, 1936); Copidosoma daccaensis (Mani, 1941); Copidosoma floridanus (Ashmead, 1900); Copidosoma intermedium (Mercet, 1921); Copidosoma japonicum Ashmead, 1904; Copidosoma javae (Girault, 1917); Copidosoma maculatum (Ishii, 1928); Copidosoma phytometrae (Risbec, 1951); Copidosoma walshi (Mercet, 1922); Holcencyrtus calypso Crawford, 1914; Litomastix argentinus Brèthes, 1913; Litomastix brethesi Blanchard, 1936; Litomastix calypso (Crawford, 1914); Litomastix daccaensis Mani, 1941; Litomastix floridana (Ashmead, 1900); Litomastix floridanus (Ashmead, 1900); Litomastix intermedia Mercet, 1921; Litomastix intermedius Mercet, 1921; Litomastix javae (Girault, 1917); Litomastix maculata Ishii, 1928; Litomastix phytometrae (Risbec, 1951); Litomastix walshi Mercet, 1922

Species of wasp

Copidosoma floridanum is a species of wasp in the family Encyrtidae which is primarily a parasitoid of moths in the subfamily Plusiinae. It has the largest recorded brood of any parasitoidal insect, at 3,055 individuals. The life cycle begins when a female oviposits into the eggs of a suitable host species, laying one or two eggs per host. Each egg divides repeatedly and develops into a brood of multiple individuals, a phenomenon called polyembryony. The larvae grow inside their host, breaking free at the end of the host's own larval stage.

A cosmopolitan species, Copidosoma floridanum is distributed worldwide. Because of its significance to agriculture as pest control and its phylogenic relationship with other important species, the wasp's genome is being sequenced by the Human Genome Sequencing Center as part of the i5K project, which aims to sequence the genomes of 5,000 arthropods.

== Behavior ==
=== Reproductive altruism ===
As a putatively eusocial species, C. floridanum embodies only two of the four behavioral characteristics that characterize genuine eusociality: larvae live in groups, and there is reproductive division of labor, or reproductive altruism. The second characteristic, reproductive altruism, is, in these wasps, manifested as a sterile soldier caste that has the sole purpose of protecting their reproductive clonal siblings throughout their larval stage. Reproductive altruism behavior plays a major role in the survival and reproductive success of C. floridanum. This species displays haplodiploid sex determination, which increases relatedness among females from 0.5 to 0.75 because males develop from unfertilized eggs and are therefore haploid while females develop from normally fertilized eggs and are therefore diploid. So, as a result of eusocial progeny allocation and a distinctive type of clonal development in parasitized hosts, polyembryonic wasps including C. floridanum are able to thrive. Additionally, these wasps modify their caste ratios in response to interspecific competition, creating a trade-off between reproduction and defense, as the wasps adapt to the levels of competition within the group.

=== Aggression and spite ===
C. floridanum produce eggs that divide clonally to produce larger broods. The polyembryonic wasp caste system consists of two separate groups: some of the embryos in a clone mature into reproductive larvae that ultimately develop into adults, while the other group consists of sterile soldier larvae that protect siblings from competitors. At this ecological level, the soldiers' reproductive altruism is tied to clone-level allocation to defense; thus, in order to maximize the reproductive success of the siblings, soldiers risk their own chances of reproductive success (with no conflict between the soldiers themselves). In his study, Giron argues that soldier aggression in this wasp species is inversely related to competitors' genetic relatedness, without respect to levels of resource competition. In a later study, Giron sought to differentiate between the aggression of female and male soldiers, finding that the latter group is non-aggressive toward all competitors.

Polyembryonic wasps, including C. floridanum, exhibit spite through instances of precocious larval development. Spite provides an explanation for how natural selection can favor harmful behaviors that are costly to both the actor and the recipient; spite is typically considered a form of altruism that benefits a secondary recipient. Two criteria demonstrate that spite is truly occurring: (i) the behavior is truly costly to the actor and does not provide a long-term direct benefit; and (ii) harming behaviors are directed toward relatively unrelated individuals.

In C. floridanum, the process takes place in the following manner: the wasp lays two eggs (one male and one female) in the egg of a moth. The wasp eggs proceed to divide asexually to produce a brood of clonal brothers and clonal sisters. The wasp larvae then mature within the moth caterpillar, utilizing the moth as food throughout growth. Competition for resources limits how many adult wasps can emerge from the host; this indicates that negative relatedness likely exists within the brood. A portion of the larvae do not emerge, who serve as adults who forgo future reproduction in order to kill relatively unrelated opposite-sex siblings maturing in the same host before dying themselves; this special group of adult killers developed precociously. Asymmetrical dispersal (defined as the sex differences in the scale of competition) and asymmetrical relatedness (brothers tend to be more related to sisters than the reverse) most likely serve as the evolutionary resolution of this conflict, in favor of the sisters. This process, most importantly, frees up resources for closer relatives.

==== Soldier's spite behavior ====
C. floridanum gain interspecific competitive advantage over other competitors, including Glyptapanteles pallipes and Microplitis demolitor, primarily due to the presence of their soldier caste, whose fitness is limited to the survival of their clonal siblings. Uka et al. studied the interspecific competition between C. floridanum male broods and G. pallipes in order to elucidate the defensive strategies of the former group. The C. floridanum progeny survival rate was greater than that of G. pallipes, regardless of the interval of oviposition. C. floridanum gains a competitive advantage through its ability to physiologically suppress or putatively attack its adversaries. First off, they secrete a physiologically suppressive factor from in their labial glands as embryos or even in the tissue of the host and steadily supplied to the hemolymph. This toxic factor causes damage to G. pallipes larvae and ultimately leads to death. More specifically, C. floridanum induces a delay in competitor maturation, along with generating paralysis and weakness (Uki). Physical attack, on the other hand, has not been proven to be effective as a means of killing competitors.

=== Cellular compatibility of wasp within host ===
The morula-stage embryo of C. floridanum invades the embryo of the host, utilizing adherent junctions to host cells. This is an effective evolutionary strategy, as other approaches could leave obvious wounds on the host cells, alerting competitors to the presence of this wasp species. As a result, these embryos can invade a phylogenetically distant host embryo (the moth) by taking advantage of the compatibility of its cells with host tissues.

=== Kin discrimination ===
During larval development, an extraembryonic membrane surrounds each organism during maturation with the caterpillar host. A series of experiments performed by Giron and Strand proved that this membrane serves as the cue for kin selection; they demonstrated that attack rates were less common with kinship when the membrane was present. When the membrane was removed, attack rates between kin increased. This study additionally demonstrated how the membrane functions as a cue for kin discrimination by switching the membranes between larvae. Researchers found that the soldiers were fooled into not killing relatively unrelated larvae that were encased by a transplanted membrane.

=== Caste-based identity: genetic and development influences ===
Recently, studies have been conducted to identify differentially expressed genes in C. floridanum castes that code for identifiable ions and proteins that the sterile soldiers, for instance, share. Soldiers and reproductive larvae express enzymes with the differential usage of proteinase inhibitors and ribosomal proteins. More specifically, odorant binding proteins (OBPs) are utilized for kin recognition, along with the likely usage of toxin-like and SP genes in the ability of soldiers to murder competitors or as immune defense against potential pathogens. The host's molting cycle plays a significant role in determining the identity of precocious and reproductive larvae. More specifically, the C. floridanum young mature in synchrony with specific phases within the moth's molting cycle. In the early stages of embryonic development, changes within the host's developmental program intrinsically influence caste determination.
