= Ohno's law =

Ohno's law was proposed by a Japanese-American biologist Susumu Ohno, saying that the gene content of the mammalian species has been conserved over species not only in the DNA content but also in the genes themselves. That is, nearly all mammalian species have conserved the X chromosome from their primordial X chromosome of a common ancestor.

== Evidence ==
Mammalian X chromosomes in various species, including human and mouse, have nearly the same size, with the content of about 5% of the genome. Additionally, for individual gene loci, a number of X-linked genes are common throughout mammalian species. Examples include glucose-6-phosphate dehydrogenase (G6PD), and the genes for Factor VIII and Factor IX. Moreover, no instances were found where an X-linked gene in one species was located on an autosome in the other species.

== Conservation mechanisms ==
The content of a chromosome would be changed mainly by mutation after duplication of the chromosome and translocation with other chromosomes. However, in mammals, since the chromosomal sex-determination mechanism would have been established in their earlier stages of evolution, polyploidy would have not occurred due to its incompatibility with the sex-determining mechanism. Moreover, X-autosome translocation would have been prohibited because it might have resulted in detrimental effects for survival to the organism. Thus in mammals, the content of X chromosomes has been conserved after typical 2 round duplication events at early ancestral stages of evolution, at the fish or amphibia (2R hypothesis).

== Contradicting and supportive evidence ==
Genes on the long arm of the human X are contained in the monotreme X and genes on the short arm of the human X are distributed on the autosomes of marsupials. Ohno commented to the result that monotremes and marsupials were not considered to be ancestors of true mammals, but they have diverged very early from the main line of mammals.

By comparison, Chloride channel gene (CLCN4) was mapped to the human X but on chromosome 7 of C57BL/6 mice, species of Mus musculus, though the gene is located on X of Mus spretus and rat.

== Dictionary entries ==
- Rédei GP (2003). "Ohno's law." Encyclopedic dictionary of genetics, genomics, and proteomics, 2nd ed. New York: Wiley-Liss, p. 870. ISBN 0-471-26821-6.
