= Human Genome Sequencing Center =

The Baylor College of Medicine Human Genome Sequencing Center (BCM-HGSC) was established by Richard A. Gibbs in 1996 when Baylor College of Medicine was chosen as one of six worldwide sites to complete the final phase of the international Human Genome Project. Gibbs is the current director of the BCM-HGSC.

It occupies more than 36,000 square feet (3,300 m^{2}), employing over 180 staff, and is one of three National Institutes of Health funded genome centers that were involved in the completion of the first human genome sequence. The BCM-HGSC contributed approximately 10 percent of the total project by sequencing chromosomes 3, 12 and X. The BCM-HGSC collaborated with researchers at the U.S. Department of Energy's Lawrence Berkeley National Laboratory and Celera Genomics to sequence the first species of fruit fly, Drosophila melanogaster. The BCM-HGSC also completed the second species of fruit fly (Drosophila pseudoobscura), the honeybee (Apis mellifera), and led an international consortium to sequence the brown Norway rat.

The BCM-HGSC subsequently sequenced and annotated the genome of the cow (Bos taurus), the sea urchin, rhesus macaque, tammar wallaby, Dictyostelium discoideum, and a number of bacteria that cause serious infections (Rickettsia typhi, Enterococcus faecium, Mannheimia haemolytica, and Fusobacterium nucleatum). The BCM-HGSC was a major contributor to the Mammalian Gene Collection program, to sequence all human cDNAs, as well as the International Haplotype Mapping Project (HapMap).

Other research within the BCM-HGSC includes new molecular technologies for mapping and sequencing, novel chemistries for DNA tagging, instrumentation for DNA manipulation, new computer programs for genomic data analysis, the genes expressed in childhood leukemias, the genomic differences that lead to evolutionary changes, the role of host genetic variation in the course of infectious disease, and the molecular basis of specific genetic diseases. The sequencing for the Drosophila Genetic Reference Panel (DGRP) was performed here. The DGRP is a collaborative effort started by Trudy Mackay to establish a common standard for Drosophila melanogaster research. The HGSC has an active bioinformatics program, with research projects involving biologists and computer scientists. Problems under study focus on developing tools for generating, manipulating, and analyzing genome data.

The BCM-HGSC is also involved with the Human Heredity and Health in Africa (H3Africa) Consortium. This collaboration resulted in a major study led by Neil Hanchard in which whole genome sequencing was performed on 426 individuals from 50 ethnolinguistic groups across Africa. As part of this study, more than 3 million previously un-described variants were uncovered.
