= Alan Robertson (geneticist) =

English geneticist (1920–1989)

Alan Robertson OBE FRS FRSE
- Alan Robertson
- Born: 21 February 1920; Preston
- Died: 25 April 1989 (aged 69)
- Citizenship: British
- Education: Liverpool Institute High School for Boys; University of Cambridge (BA)
- Awards: Fellow of the Royal Society (1964); Mendel Medal (1984); Fellow of the Royal Society of Edinburgh
- Scientific career
- Fields: Population genetics
- Workplaces: University of Edinburgh
- Doctoral students: William G. Hill; Trudy Mackay; Paul M. Sharp

Alan Robertson (21 February 1920 – 25 April 1989) was an English population geneticist. Originally a chemist, he was recruited after the Second World War to work on animal genetics on behalf of the British government, and continued in this sphere until his retirement in 1985. He was a major influence in the widespread adoption of artificial insemination of cattle.

In addition to his work on agricultural genetics, Robertson undertook extensive studies of other branches of genetics, developing an influential secondary theorem of natural selection. He acquired an international reputation, receiving state and academic honours from Europe, America and Asia.

== Education and early life ==
Robertson was born in Preston, Lancashire, the second and only surviving child of John Mouat Robertson, an employee of the Post Office, and his wife Annie, née Grace, who was the younger sister of the University of Cambridge mathematician John Hilton Grace. Annie Robertson died within days of his birth, and Alan was brought up by his aunt Bessie Grace on the family farm at Halewood, near Liverpool. He was educated at Halewood village school from where he won a scholarship to the Liverpool Institute High School in 1930. He distinguished himself there in languages and in science under the tutelage of the chemistry master L. A. Naylor. In 1938 he won a scholarship to Gonville and Caius College, Cambridge, to read chemistry. He graduated in 1941 with an upper second class degree, and became a research student in the Department of Colloidal Science at Cambridge.

During the Second World War Robertson served in the Operational Research Section of Coastal Command. The head of the unit was Conrad Hal Waddington, who after the war invited Robertson to join him in a new research body, the National Animal Breeding and Genetics Research Organisation (NABGRO). In an obituary study of Robertson, William G. Hill wrote, "At this stage Alan could have had no more than a passing acquaintance with genetics, but he did have a firm understanding of practical farming. … Waddington wanted to apply operational research methods to animal breeding and recognized Alan's mathematical talents and ability in operational research."

== Research and career ==
After spending nine months in the US receiving training in genetics and animal breeding with Sewall Wright and Jay Laurence Lush, Robertson took up his work at NABGRO, based in Edinburgh. The organisation was split into two parts, and Robertson became a member of the Unit of Animal Genetics, where he spent the rest of his career. At first he worked on improving dairy cattle using mathematical and statistical methods to devise the most effective breeding programmes. Away from the everyday work of the Unit, Robertson also worked on evolutionary biology, studying how variation is maintained in populations, and particularly the roles of mutation and of stabilising selection. Hill writes that Robertson made "original contributions to the theory of genetic change in small populations and introduced a theory of limits to artificial selection … a combination of mathematical insight, quantitative genetic principles, and practical context, of which only he was capable."

Robertson continued to work on dairy-related research and wider theoretical studies. He did much to introduce widespread use of artificial insemination in dairy cattle, and worked for many years on estimating genetic effects that influence quantitative traits, and he developed what became known as the "secondary theorem of natural selection." He held the post of Deputy chief scientific officerof his Unit, and kept away from administrative duties. Hill recalled that Robertson "remained informal, approachable, and 'Alan' to all. His influence was through his papers, as a scientific referee, by personal contact (particularly in his famous morning coffee group), as a conference speaker and organizer, and as an example of efficient (if not organized) hard work." His doctoral students included William G. Hill, Trudy Mackay and Paul M. Sharp.

=== Awards and honours ===
Robertson was elected a Fellow of the Royal Society (FRS) in 1964. Two years later he was elected a Fellow of the Royal Society of Edinburgh (FRSE). He was appointed Honorary Professor of Edinburgh University (1967), and received honorary degrees and memberships of the United States National Academy of Sciences (1979), the University of Hohenheim (1968), the Agricultural University of Norway (1984), the Danish Agricultural University (1986), the University of Liège (1986), and the Genetics Society of Japan. He was appointed Order of the British Empire in 1965, and received the Gold Medal of the Royal Agricultural Society (1958) and the Order of Isabel la Católica (1974).

The Alan Robertson chair of Genetics at the University of Edinburgh is named in his honour. As of 2016 the post is held by Paul M. Sharp.

== Personal life ==
In January 1947, Robertson married Margaret Bernheim, a NABGRO colleague, with whom he had two sons and a daughter. He was a member of the Farmers Club. Robertson retired in 1985, and died in Edinburgh in 1989, aged 69.
