= Desmond G. Higgins =

Irish bioinformatics professor (born 1959)

Des Higgins
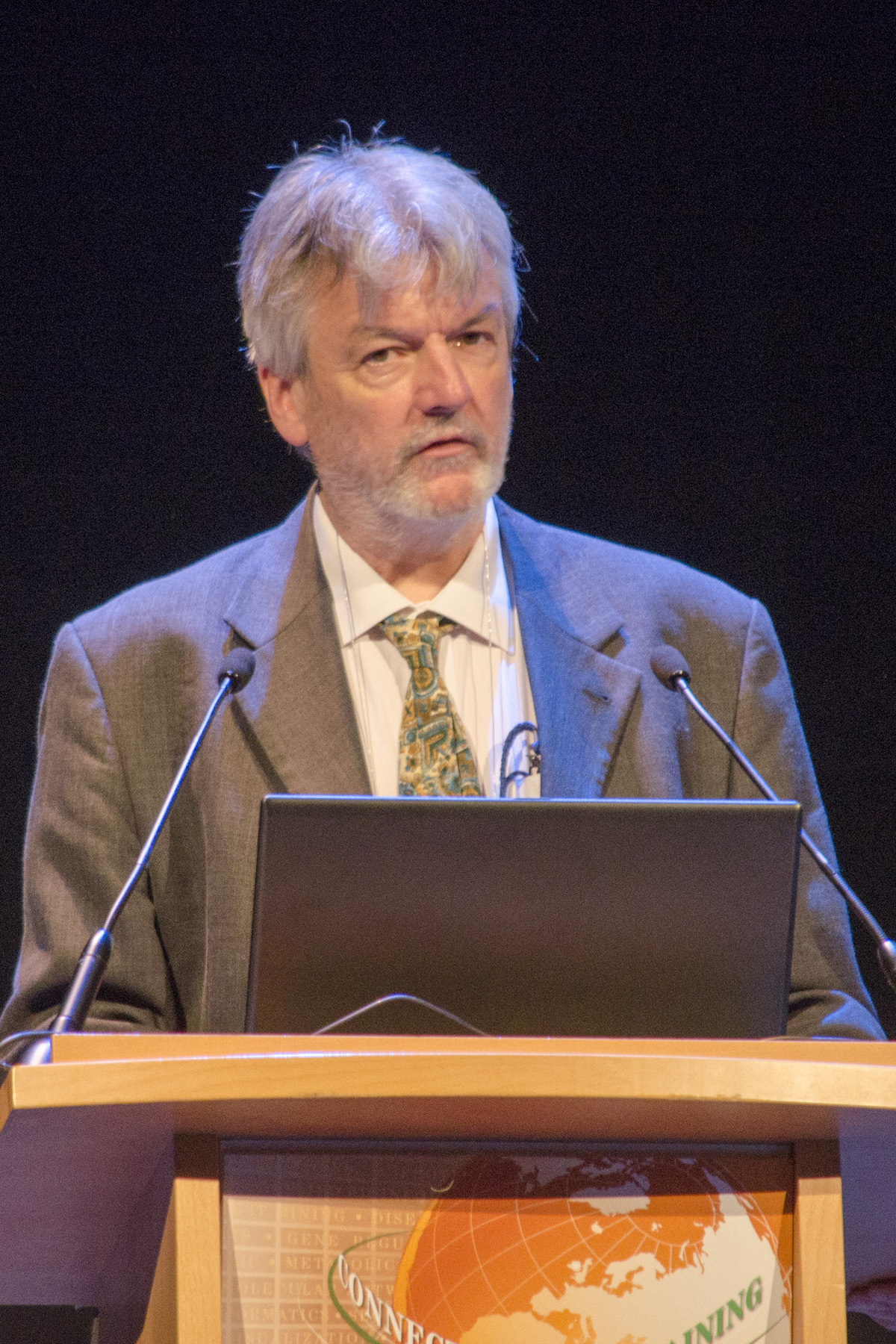
- Des Higgins speaking at the ISMB conference in 2015.
- Born: Desmond Gerard Higgins; 17 July 1959 (age 67)
- Education: Trinity College, Dublin (PhD)
- Known for: CLUSTAL; T-Coffee
- Awards: ISCB Fellow (2015); Benjamin Franklin Award (2018); Lennart Philipson Award (2023)
- Scientific career
- Fields: Evolution; Bioinformatics; Sequence alignment; Genomics
- Workplaces: University College Dublin; University College Cork
- Thesis: A numerical taxonomy of the Pterygote insects (1988)
- Academic advisors: Paul M. Sharp
- Website: www.bioinf.ucd.ie; www.ucd.ie/conway/research/researchers/conwayfellowsa-z/professordeshiggins

Desmond Gerard Higgins is a Professor of Bioinformatics at University College Dublin, widely known for CLUSTAL, a series of computer programs for performing multiple sequence alignment. According to Nature, Higgins' papers describing CLUSTAL are among the top ten most highly cited scientific papers of all time.

== Education ==
Higgins was educated at Trinity College, Dublin where he was awarded an B.A. (mod) in Botany in 1981 and PhD in 1988 for research on numerical taxonomy of Pterygote insects.

== Research ==
Research in the Higgins laboratory focuses on developing new bioinformatics and statistical tools for evolutionary biology. The CLUSTAL program for multiple sequence alignment has been developed in the Higgins lab and the T-Coffee software was initially developed in the lab with by Cedric Notredame. Multivariate statistics are used to analyse microarray data sets and molecular evolution such as the evolution of promoters, introns and non-coding RNA.

== Awards and honours ==
Higgins was elected a Fellow of the International Society for Computational Biology (ISCB) in 2015. He was awarded the Kimura Motoo Award in 2016 for his contributions to the advancement of evolutionary biology and molecular phylogeny. In 2018, Higgins received the Benjamin Franklin Award for open access in the life sciences. In March 2023, Higgins was awarded the Lennart Philipson Award in recognition of his major contributions towards enabling bioinformatics technologies based on multiple sequence alignment.
