= Sounds of HIV =

2010 album by Alexandra Pajak

Sounds of HIV: Music Transcribed from DNA is a composition and album by Alexandra Pajak. The work is a musical adaptation of the genetic material of HIV/AIDS.

At the time of the piece's creation, Pajak was a graduate student at the University of Georgia, studying clinical social work. She conceived of the project when the HIV genome was first sequenced in 2009. After examining the National Institute of Health's record of the genome, Pajak composed Sounds of HIV by assigning pitches to various nucleotides, proteins, and amino acids, in part based on affinity for water. Pajak noted "The sounds literally reflect the nature of the virus...you're literally hearing the entire genome of the HIV virus." She described the genome as "melodic but ultimately somber", comparing it to "rhythmic" DNA and the "repetitive" genome of the West Nile virus, a previous compositional project. Pajak's other previous compositions include a piece based on the DNA of the mother of the founder of Agnes Scott College, where she did her undergraduate degree.

The finished piece in A minor includes 9,181 "nucleotide-notes". It is scored for piano, flute, clarinet, oboe, horn, and cello. In his review of the work, Robert Tomas noted the "general sense of unease, creeping in[to]...this undeniably beautiful music", adding "what terrible beauty is there to be found should we glimpse inside the genome of the plague, syphilis, smallpox or even flu?"

The album, recorded by the instrumental group Sequence Ensemble in Atlanta, Georgia, was released by Azica Records on 26 October 2010. The 52-minute album has 17 tracks: a prelude, nine proteins (one in three parts and two on a single track), and a six-part postlude. Part of the proceeds from sales of the album were donated to Emory Vaccine Center to fund research into HIV/AIDS and potential vaccines.

== See also ==
- Protein music
