= Drosophila Genetic Reference Panel =

Drosophila Genetic Reference Panel (DGRP) is a suite of Drosophila melanogaster lines derived from an out-crossed population in Raleigh, North Carolina. The founders of these lineages were collected from the Raleigh State Farmer's Market 35.764254°N 78.662935°W. The suite consists of 205 fully sequenced lines which have been inbred to near homozygosity. The primary goal of the DGRP is to provide a common set of strain for quantitative genetics research in Drosophila. Each researcher who uses the lines from the DGRP will have access to other researchers' data, which will be stored in a publicly available database. This allows for analyses to be performed across studies without having to worry about complications arising from different labs using genomically different lines of fruit flies.

== Objectives ==
These lines are useful for performing QTL maps, as every line is fully sequenced. This allows for association mapping to be performed, which looks for genomic regions that are correlated to a phenotype. As labs produce QTL maps a comprehensive picture of the Drosophila genome will emerge with unprecedented resolution. Currently, dozens of quantitative traits are being examined by researchers, including longevity, phototaxis, mating behavior, wing morphology and oviposition site preference.

== Current uses ==
The pilot proof of concept and development of the DGRP came from the Trudy Mackay lab in Raleigh, North Carolina. The sequencing was done by Baylor College of Medicine Sequencing Center, in collaboration with Richard Gibbs and Stephen Richards.

The preliminary sequence data can be obtained from a public database hosted by Baylor College of Medicine in the Texas Medical Center. Raw sequencing data from the project can be found in the NCBI Sequence Read Archive.

== Specific studies ==
Preliminary data has been presented at Genetics Society of America in Boston, Massachusetts. The study investigates the sleep behavior of Drosophila to uncover the genes that are responsible. The data suggest that at least 998 genes are responsible for some of the measurable variation found, including candidate genes CrebB-17A, rutabaga, Shaker and the gene encoding the epidermal growth factor receptor have all been implicated in other studies as being involved in sleep behavior.

Researchers have also uncovered a genotype by diet interaction that drives phenotypic variation. Recently published data indicates that the interaction between a fly's genome and its environment plays a substantial role in determining the phenotype. This suggests that some individuals are obese on a high-fat diet, but can retain a slimmer phenotype on a high-sugar diet. Other studies into genetic determinants of diet response have shown that effects on longevity are highly dependent on genotype, though this has also revealed new diet-responsive longevity genes such as OXR1.
