= Kenneth H. Wolfe =

Irish geneticist and academic

Ken Wolfe FRS MRIA
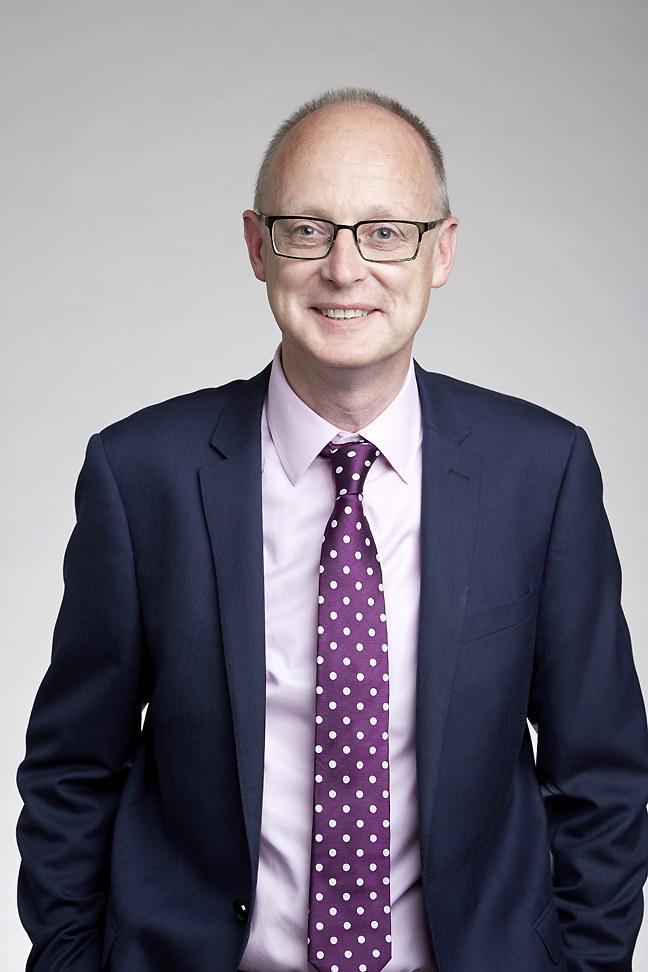
- Ken Wolfe at the Royal Society admissions day in London, July 2017
- Born: Kenneth Henry Wolfe
- Education: Trinity College Dublin (BA, PhD)
- Awards: EMBO Member (2010)
- Scientific career
- Fields: Comparative genomics Yeast genetics Bioinformatics
- Workplaces: University College Dublin; Trinity College Dublin; Indiana University Bloomington
- Thesis: Rates of nucleotide substitution in higher plants and mammals (1990)
- Doctoral advisor: Paul M. Sharp
- Other academic advisors: Jeffrey D. Palmer
- Doctoral students: Mario A. Fares; Aoife McLysaght; Estelle Proux-Wéra; Cathal Seoighe
- Website: wolfe.ucd.ie

Kenneth Henry Wolfe FRS MRIA is an Irish geneticist and professor of genomic evolution at University College Dublin (UCD), Ireland.

== Education ==
Wolfe was educated at Trinity College Dublin, where he was awarded Bachelor of Arts degree in genetics in 1986 followed by a PhD in 1990 for research investigating synonymous substitution in vascular plants and mammals supervised by Paul M. Sharp.

== Research and career ==
Wolfe's research focuses on comparative genomics, yeast genetics and bioinformatics. Work in his laboratory investigates the evolution of eukaryotic genomes and chromosome organisation. He is best known for his discovery that the genome of the yeast Saccharomyces cerevisiae underwent complete genome duplication about 100 million years ago, an event that is now known to be the result of hybridization between two divergent species. This finding reshaped our understanding both of yeast biology, and of mechanisms of genome evolution in eukaryotes. His subsequent discoveries of similar ancient genome duplications (paleopolyploidy) during human evolution, and in almost all families of flowering plants, led to the realisation that whole-genome duplication is widespread. His group also studies the origin and evolution of mating systems in yeasts, and the process of mating-type switching in which one cell type can change into another by moving or replacing a section of chromosome.

Wolfe was a postdoctoral researcher with Jeffrey D. Palmer at Indiana University Bloomington before returning to Ireland in 1992 to establish his research group in the genetics department of Trinity College Dublin, where he remained for over 20 years. In 2013, he moved to University College Dublin's UCD School of Medicine and Conway Institute. As of 2017 his most highly cited peer reviewed papers have been published in leading scientific journals including Nature, PNAS, The Plant Cell, Genome Research and Nature Reviews Genetics.

Former doctoral students from the Wolfe lab include Mario A. Fares, Aoife McLysaght, Kevin P. Byrne, Estelle Proux-Wéra and Cathal Seoighe.

=== Awards and honours ===
Wolfe was elected a Fellow of the Royal Society (FRS) in 2017, a member of the Royal Irish Academy (MRIA) in 2000 and a member of the European Molecular Biology Organization (EMBO) in 2010. In 2011 he served as president of the Society for Molecular Biology and Evolution (smbe.org).
