= Trudy Mackay =

British geneticist (born 1952)

Trudy Mackay FRS
- Born: Trudy Frances Charlene Mackay; September 10, 1952 (age 73); Moncton, New Brunswick, Canada
- Education: Dalhousie University; University of Edinburgh (PhD)
- Known for: Drosophila Genetic Reference Panel
- Spouse: Robert R. H. Anholt (m. 1990)
- Awards: Genetics Society of America Medal (2004); Wolf Prize in Agriculture (2016); Dawson Prize in Genetics (2018); Darwin–Wallace Medal (2025)
- Scientific career
- Fields: Quantitative genetics
- Institutions: North Carolina State University Clemson University
- Thesis: Genetic variation in varying environments (1979)
- Doctoral advisor: Alan Robertson
- Website: scienceweb.clemson.edu/chg/dr-trudy-frances-charlene-mackay-2/

Trudy Frances Charlene Mackay FRS (born 10 September 1952) is the director of Clemson University's Center for Human Genetics located on the campus of the Greenwood Genetic Center. She is recognized as one of the world's leading authorities on the genetics of complex traits. Mackay is also the Self Family Chair in Human Genetics and Professor of Genetics and Biochemistry at Clemson University.

Mackay is a member of the National Academy of Sciences (2010).

Mackay was formerly the William Neal Reynolds and Distinguished University Professor at North Carolina State University, where she specialized in quantitative genetics. She is responsible for establishing the Drosophila Genetic Reference Panel.

== Education ==
Mackay received a Bachelor of Science degree in 1974 and Master of Science degree in 1976 in Biology from Dalhousie University. She completed postgraduate study at the University of Edinburgh with a PhD in genetics awarded in 1979 for research supervised by Alan Robertson.

== Career and research ==
Mackay's research investigates the environmental and genetic factors that influence quantitative traits. These phenotypic traits include height or weight and are represented by continuous, rather than discrete, values. Her work is undertaken by studying the impact of natural variants and mutations on many behavioural, morphological, physiological and life history traits in fruit flies, which she uses as a model organism.

The broad importance of such traits gives Mackay's work potential application in many areas — from improving plant breeding and animal breeding to the treatment of human diseases. Mackay is the co-author with Douglas Scott Falconer of the fourth edition of the widely used and highly cited textbook, Introduction to Quantitative Genetics, published in 1996.

=== Awards and honours ===
Mackay was elected a Fellow of the Royal Society (FRS) in 2006. She was awarded the Genetics Society of America Medal in 2004 and the Wolf Prize in Agriculture in 2016. She was elected to the American Philosophical Society in 2021. She is a recipient of Trinity College’s Dawson Prize in Genetics in 2018. She was elected Fellow of the American Association for the Advancement of Science in 2003. She became a member of the American Academy of Arts and Sciences in 2005. Mackay was elected a Member of the National Academy of Medicine in 2024, and was awarded the Darwin–Wallace Medal in 2025.

== Personal life ==
Mackay married Robert R. H. Anholt in 1990.
