= Richard Gibbs (biologist) =

Australian geneticist

Richard Alexander Gibbs, AC, is an Australian geneticist. He is currently the Wofford Cain Chair and Professor of Molecular and Human Genetics at Baylor College of Medicine in Houston, Texas.

In 1996, he founded the Human Genome Sequencing Center at BCM, which was one of five worldwide sites selected to complete the final phase of the Human Genome Project.
