= Superparasitism =

Superparasitism is a form of parasitism in which the host (typically an insect larva such as a caterpillar) is attacked more than once by a single species of parasitoid. Multiparasitism or coinfection, on the other hand, occurs when the host has been parasitized by more than one species. Host discrimination, whereby parasitoids can identify a host with parasites from an unparasitized host, is present in certain species of parasitoids and is used to avoid superparasitism and thus competition from other parasites. Superparasitism can result in transmission of viruses, and viruses may influence a parasitoid's behavior in favor of infecting already infected hosts, as is the case with Leptopilina boulardi.

== Examples ==
One example of superparasitism is seen in Rhagoletis juglandis, also known as the walnut husk fly. During oviposition, female flies lacerate the tissue of the inner husk of the walnut and create a cavity for her eggs. The female flies oviposit and reinfest the same walnuts and even the same oviposition sites created by conspecifics.
