= Susumu Ohno =

Japanese geneticist

- Born: 大野 乾, Ōno Susumu; 1 February 1928; Keijō, Keiki-dō, Korea, Empire of Japan (now Seoul, South Korea)
- Died: 13 January 2000 (aged 71)
- Citizenship: Japanese and American
- Education: Tokyo University of Agriculture and Technology, Hokkaido University (Ph.D., D.Sc.)
- Known for: Role of gene duplication in evolution
- Spouse: Midori Aoyama (musician)
- Children: Two sons, one daughter
- Scientific career
- Fields: genetics, evolution
- Workplaces: City of Hope Medical Center

Susumu Ohno (大野 乾, Ōno Susumu; February 1, 1928 – January 13, 2000) was a Japanese-American geneticist and evolutionary biologist, and seminal researcher in the field of molecular evolution. Due to his work on genome duplication in evolution, homologous genes that exist as duplicates due to whole genome duplication are termed ohnologs.

== Biography ==
Susumu Ohno was born to Japanese parents in Keijō, Chōsen (present-day Seoul, South Korea), Empire of Japan on February 1, 1928. The second of five children, he was the son of the minister of education of the Japanese Protectorate of Korea. The family returned to mainland Japan after the war in 1945. He later became a citizen of the United States. Susumu Ohno married musician Midori Aoyama in 1951. They had two sons and one daughter.

His passion for science derived from his lifelong love of horses. He earned a Ph.D. in veterinary science at Tokyo University of Agriculture and Technology in 1949, and later a Ph.D. and D.Sc. from Hokkaido University. He went to the United States in 1951, as a visiting scholar to UCLA, and in 1952 joined the new research department at City of Hope Medical Center, where he remained in active research until 1996.

== Scientific contributions ==
Ohno postulated that gene duplication plays a major role in evolution in his classic book Evolution by Gene Duplication (1970). While subsequent research has overwhelmingly confirmed the key role of gene duplication in molecular evolution, research to evaluate Ohno's model for the preservation of duplicate genes (now termed neofunctionalization) is ongoing and very active. He also discovered in 1956 that the Barr body of mammalian female nuclei was in fact a condensed X chromosome. In Evolution by Gene Duplication, he also suggested that vertebrate genome is the result of one or more entire genome duplications; variations of this idea have come to be known as the 2R hypothesis (also called "Ohno's hypothesis"). He indicated that mammalian X chromosomes are conserved among species; it has been referred to as Ohno's law. He also popularized the term junk DNA for segments of the DNA that have no known function.

In 1986, Ohno authored a paper published in Immunogenetics that explored the relationship between DNA genetic sequences and music. "The SARC oncogene, a malignant gene first discovered in chickens, causes cancer in humans as well. When Ohno translated the gene to music, it sounded very much like Chopin's Funeral March". "An enzyme (phosphoglyceratekinase), which breaks down sugar (glucose) in the body revealed itself to Ohno as a lullaby. "A violinist recorded the tune, and when kindergarten teachers in Tokyo play it, their youngsters yawn and willingly take their naps," said Ohno. The biologist, with no formal training in music, "decided to assign notes according to the molecular weights" and "put the heavier molecules in lower positions, and the lighter molecules higher". With DNA being composed of four subunits, he mapped each to two positions on the musics staff, forming an octave. He found that the more evolved an organism is, the more complicated is the music. His ultimate hope was "to find is some basic pattern that governs all life. . .everything."

== See also ==
- Gene duplication
- Paleopolyploidy
