= Effective number of codons =

Effective number of codons (abbreviated as ENC or Nc) is a measure to study the state of codon usage biases in genes and genomes. The way that ENC is computed has obvious similarities to the computation of effective population size in population genetics. Although it is easy to compute ENC values, it has been shown that this measure is one of the best measures to show codon usage bias.

Since the original suggestion of the ENC, several investigators have tried to improve the method, but it seems that there is much room to improve this measure.
