= Aoife McLysaght =

Irish geneticist and professor

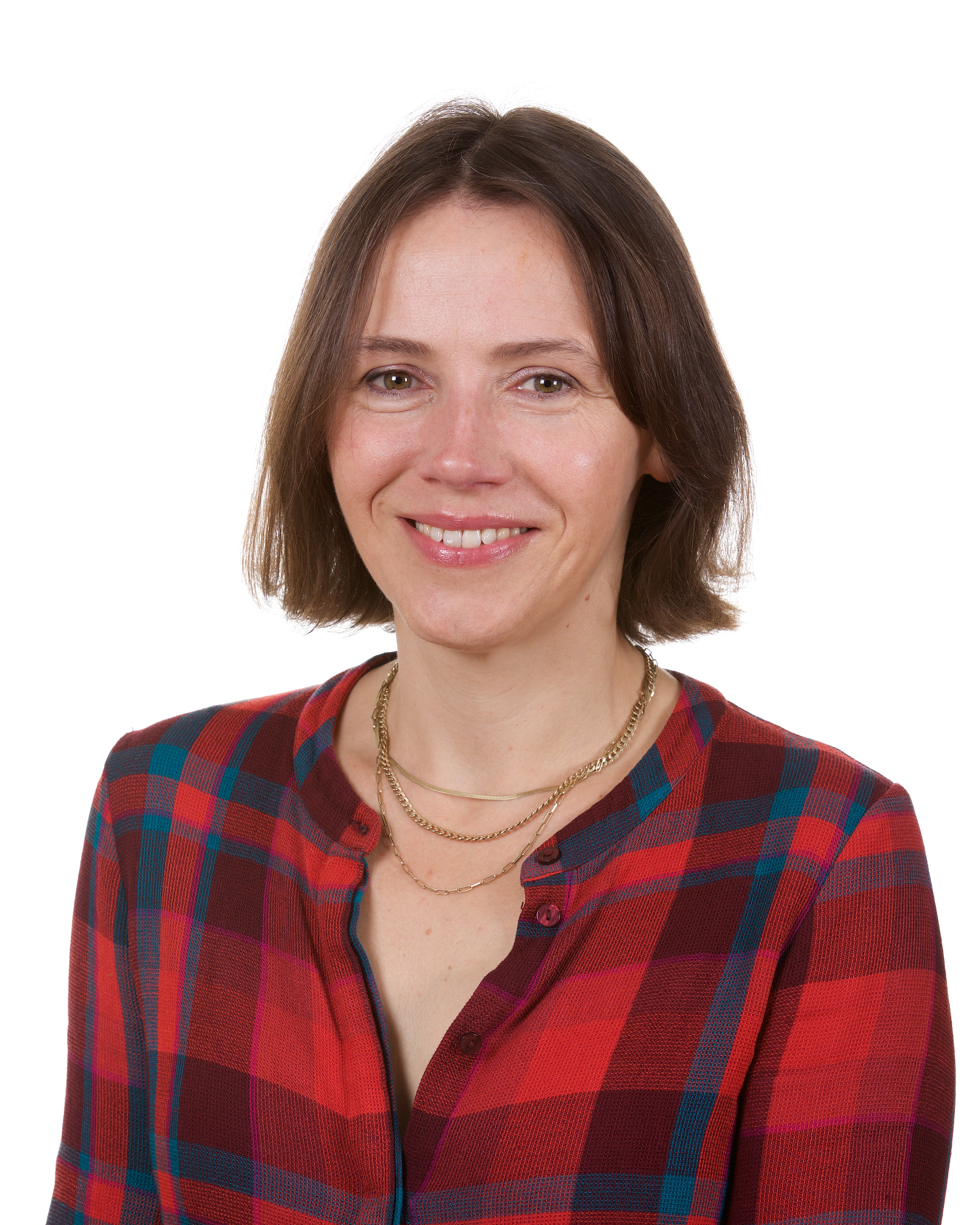
- Education: Trinity College Dublin (BA, PhD)
- Awards: European Research Council Starting Researcher Award (2013–2018); President of Ireland Young Researcher's Award Science Foundation Ireland (2005)
- Scientific career
- Fields: Molecular evolution; Comparative Genomics
- Workplaces: Trinity College Dublin; University of California, Irvine
- Thesis: Evolution of vertebrate genome organisation (2002)
- Doctoral advisor: Kenneth H. Wolfe
- Website: www.gen.tcd.ie/molevol

Aoife McLysaght is an Irish geneticist and a professor in the Molecular Evolution Laboratory of the Smurfit Institute of Genetics, Trinity College Dublin, and Government Science Advisor for the Republic of Ireland.

== Education ==
McLysaght was educated at Trinity College Dublin, where she was awarded a Bachelor of Arts degree in Genetics in 1998, followed by a PhD in 2002 for research supervised by Kenneth H. Wolfe on the evolution of vertebrate genome organisation.

== Career and research ==
Following her PhD, she completed postdoctoral research at the University of California, Irvine working with Brandon Gaut before returning to work in Dublin in 2003. Her research in molecular evolution and comparative genomics has been published in leading peer-reviewed scientific journals including Nature, Nature Genetics, Bioinformatics, Genome Research, PNAS and the journal Yeast.

She has served as senior editor and associate editor for the journals Molecular Biology and Evolution and Genome Biology and Evolution, and is on the editorial board of the journal Cell Reports. She is a member of the Society for Molecular Biology and Evolution (SMBE) and The Genetics Society. She served as Treasurer of SMBE 2012–14 and was elected President of the Society in 2017.

She was appointed Government Science Advisor for the Republic of Ireland in October 2024.

=== Outreach and media ===
McLysaght is a regular contributor to public events, and has spoken at IGNITE Electric Picnic, TEDx, The Royal Institution, and on the BBC Radio 4 programme The Infinite Monkey Cage. She brought genetics to a wider audience in the Royal Institution 2013 advent calendar where she featured in videos on human chromosome 1, human chromosome 14, mitochondrial DNA (mtDNA) and the Science Gallery, Dublin. In 2018 she joined with Alice Roberts to write and present the televised Royal Institution Christmas Lectures.

=== Awards and honours ===
McLysaght was awarded European Research Council (ERC) Consolidator Grant 2018–23 and an ERC Starting Researcher grant from 2013 to 2018, and the President of Ireland Young Researcher's Award by Science Foundation Ireland (SFI) in 2005. She gave the J. B. S. Haldane lecture of The Genetics Society in 2016. She was one of eight women scientists whose portrait was commissioned as part of the Royal Irish Academy's Women on Walls project. In March 2025, with Jocelyn Bell Burnell, she featured on an Irish postage stamp recognising Women in STEM.

In 2010 she was elected a fellow of Trinity College Dublin.

== Personal life ==
McLysaght is a granddaughter of genealogist Edward MacLysaght. McLysaght has two children, and a dog whose genome has been sequenced.
