= MRAP2 =

Protein

Identifiers
- Aliases: MRAP2, BMIQ18, C6orf117, bA51G5.2, melanocortin 2 receptor accessory protein 2
- External IDs: OMIM: 615410; MGI: 3609239; GeneCards: MRAP2

Gene location (Human)
Chr.	Chromosome 6 (human)
Band	6q14.2	Start	84,033,772 bp
Band	6q14.2	End	84,090,881 bp

Gene location (Mouse)
Chr.	Chromosome 9 (mouse)
Band	9|9 E3.1	Start	87,026,359 bp
Band	9|9 E3.1	End	87,066,098 bp
RNA expression pattern
Bgee	Human / Mouse (ortholog); Top expressed in: lateral nuclear group of thalamus; Descending thoracic aorta; ascending aorta; endothelial cell; popliteal artery; tibial arteries; right coronary artery; middle temporal gyrus; nasal epithelium; islet of Langerhans / Top expressed in: pontine nuclei; lumbar subsegment of spinal cord; central gray substance of midbrain; paraventricular nucleus of hypothalamus; supraoptic nucleus; Epithelium of choroid plexus; medial vestibular nucleus; dorsomedial hypothalamic nucleus; suprachiasmatic nucleus; lateral hypothalamus; More reference expression data
BioGPS	n/a
Gene ontology
Molecular function	type 3 melanocortin receptor binding; protein binding; type 1 melanocortin receptor binding; corticotropin hormone receptor binding; type 4 melanocortin receptor binding; identical protein binding; type 5 melanocortin receptor binding; signaling receptor regulator activity
Cellular component	integral component of membrane; plasma membrane; endoplasmic reticulum membrane; endoplasmic reticulum; membrane
Biological process	energy homeostasis; energy reserve metabolic process; feeding behavior; protein localization to plasma membrane; positive regulation of adenylate cyclase-activating G protein-coupled receptor signaling pathway; negative regulation of adenylate cyclase-activating G protein-coupled receptor signaling pathway; negative regulation of protein localization to plasma membrane; regulation of signaling receptor activity
Sources:Amigo / QuickGO
Orthologs
Databases	NCBI: entry; OMA: entry
Species	Human	Mouse
Entrez	112609	244958
Ensembl	ENSG00000135324	ENSMUSG00000042761
UniProt	Q96G30	D3Z1Q2
RefSeq (mRNA)	NM_138409; NM_001346541; NM_001346542; NM_001346543; NM_001346544	NM_001101482; NM_001177731; NM_001359955
RefSeq (protein)	NP_001333470; NP_001333471; NP_001333472; NP_001333473; NP_612418	NP_001094952; NP_001171202; NP_001346884
Location (UCSC)	Chr 6: 84.03 – 84.09 Mb	Chr 9: 87.03 – 87.07 Mb
PubMed search
- Wikidata
View/Edit Human	View/Edit Mouse

Melanocortin 2 receptor accessory protein 2 is a protein that in humans is encoded by the MRAP2 gene. MRAP2 is a transmembrane accessory protein to a family of five receptors called the melanocortin receptors (MC_{1-5}). Human genome sequencing analysis led to the discovery of MRAP2, Human MRAP2 gene is located in chromosome 6q14.3, a different chromosomal location from that of human MRAP which is a paralogy to MRAP2. MRAP2 is thought to be involved in regulating the expression of the melanocortin (MC_{1-5}) and some non-melanocortin receptors such as ghrelin receptor (GHSR-1a), orexin (OX1R) receptor and prokineticin receptor (PKR-1).

MRAP2 was found first in the adrenal gland and the brain. However, the Human protein Atlas/ RNA-seq analysis data of human genome detected MRAP2 in other tissues such as ovary, endometrium, testis, digestive tract, pituitary gland and skin.

The MRAP2 function was found to be associated with regulating appetite and energy expenditure. This is through regulating different receptors involved in the brain circuit regulating those two functions. Such receptors include MC_{4}, MC_{3}, GHSR-1a, PKR-1 and OX1R.

== Structure and functional regions ==
The MRAP2 gene is located in chromosome 6q14.3 and is composed of 4 exons with the first exon containing a non-coding sequence. The translated MRAP2 protein is a 205 amino acids single-pass transmembrane protein. The amino- (N-) terminal and the transmembrane domain were found to show a 40% similarity between MRAP2 and MRAP, while the Carboxyl- (C-) terminal is found to be different between the two proteins.

The different domains of MRAP2 were found to have different functions. The C-terminal was found essential for the inhibition of the activity of certain receptors (OX1R and PKR-1). Different sequences of the N- terminal have two separate function with the 23-33 amino sequence being responsible for the surface expression of OX1R, while the 34-43 sequence was found to have a negative auto-regulatory role over MRAP2 function.

MRAP2 is located both on the cell membrane and also sub-cellularly in the endoplasmic reticulum. The MRAP2 shares a unique feature with MRAP as both were found to show a dual topology orientation. Immunofluorescence imaging and live cell imaging studies showed both the C- terminal and the N-terminal expressed on the cell membrane and in the luminal surface of the endoplasmic reticulum. The Dual orientation feature enables the formation of homodimers (MRAP2/MRAP2) and heterodimer (MRAP2/MRAP). Post-translational processing of MRAP2 protein includes the N-linked glycosylation which plays an important factor in MRAP2 enabling MC_{2} stimulation by adrenocorticotropic hormone (ACTH).

Phylogenetic studies had located MRAP2 gene in different species such as mammals, chickens, piscine species (tetrapod and zebrafish), bony fish subspecies, sea lamprey and cartilaginous fish. The detection of MRAP2 in the last two species suggested that MRAP2 as an ancestral role by giving rise to MRAP through gene duplication as MRAP was absent in those two species. but this claim was dismissed upon locating MRAP cDNA in elephant sharks.

== Cellular activity ==
The distribution of MRAP2 in the brain within the appetite control and weight control regions revealed its involvement in those two regulatory circuits. MRAP2 was found regulate the expression and response of MC_{4}, and MC_{3}. MC_{4} role has a well described in appetite control in the brain. MC_{4} is mediating an anorexic effect in the hypothalamus. MRAP2 was found in high levels in brain regions that is associated with feeding behaviour such as the paraventricular nucleus of the hypothalamus. MRAP2/MC_{4} double knockout transgenic mice were found morbidly obese. Also, the treatment of MC_{4}/MRAP2 transfected cells with the melanocortin ligand alpha -melanocyte stimulating hormone (α-MSH) generated a response (increased cAMP production). Similar response was seen in MC_{3}/MRAP2 transfected cells which indicate an interaction of MRAP2 with the two anorexic receptors in the brain.

Unlike MRAP, MRAP2 interacts with other GPCRs that does not belong to the melanocortin receptors family. The common factor between all of the receptors under the regulation of MRAP2 is that they are all involved in controlling appetite and energy expenditure. The receptors that were found to be regulated by MRAP2 until now are the growth hormone secretagogue receptor 1a (GHSR-1a); prokineticin receptor (PKR-1); and orexin receptor (OX1R). While MRAP2 was stimulates feeding by increasing the expression and activity of GHSR-1, MRAP2 was also found to stimulate feeding by suppressing PKR-1 activity. In contrast to this positive effect on feeding behaviour, MRAP2 was found also to suppress appetite by down-regulating the expression of orexigenic receptor OX1R. The two opposite effects of MRAP2 on feeding behaviour might indicate that this accessory protein is regulating most of the key receptors involved in appetite control.

MRAP2 is found in the adrenal gland where MRAP is known to regulate MC_{2} surface expression and function. In vivo studies had revealed MRAP2 to interact with MC_{2} leading to an increase in the receptor surface expression as well as enhancing the response of the receptor to adrenocorticotropic hormone (ACTH) stimulation. However, MC_{2} stimulation by ACTH is more potent in the presence of MRAP compared to MRAP2. MRAP2 was also, found expressed in the developing adrenals and is considered to assist in the differentiation of the gland and its zonation.

== Obesity ==
Screening the MRAP2 coding region and the intron-exon boundaries of the MRAP2 gene sequence had initially identified four genetic variants and only one generated a disrupted MRAP2 protein. The other three variants were located in the C-terminal which led to the belief that these mutations were not disrupting the translated MRAP2 protein. A mutational sequencing analyses of the coding region of MRAP2 had identified eight more genetic variants of MRAP2, all of which were found in unrelated extremely obese individuals and none was found in the control group. The detected MRAP2 variants were found to be heterozygotic and were found to be rare in the studied population. The identified MRAP2 eight variants were either: intronic, synonymous, non-synonymous, and coding. Studying the effect of those variants on MC_{4} signalling revealed only the non-synonymous MRAP2 variant to cause a diminished MC_{4} signalling activity. Most of the identified mutations were detected in obese individuals with no obesity-related symptoms and those mutations. MRAP2 knockout mice models revealed the obesity phenotype of those models to be different from the phenotype caused by MC_{4} knockout models that might be due to MRAPs interactions with other appetite and energy homeostasis mediators. Even with the detection of the different MRAP2 genetic variants in extremely obese individuals, the underlying mechanism by which these mutations cause obesity is not clearly understood. This could be attributed to the involvement of MRAP2 in the regulation of different orexigenic and anorectic receptors expression and signaling. The MRAP2 targeted deletion in the different regions of the appetite control circuit could provide more insight into the pathophysiological mechanism of obesity caused by MRAP2 variants.

Uncovering MRAP2 interactions with the melanocortin receptors and other GPCRs is yet to be completed to understand the exact mechanism of regulatory action of this unique accessory protein. The widespread MRAP2 distribution outside the feeding and weight control circuits could indicate a role for MRAP2 that extends beyond its currently described role and might also unveil its association with different pathophysiological conditions.
