= Paleopolyploidy =

State of having undergone whole genome duplication in deep evolutionary time

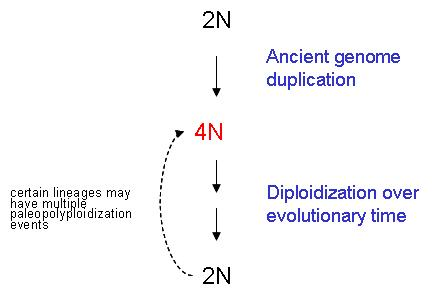
Overview of paleopolyploidy process. Many higher eukaryotes were paleopolyploids at some point during their evolutionary history.

Paleopolyploidy is the result of genome duplications which occurred at least several million years ago (MYA). Such an event could either double the genome of a single species (autopolyploidy) or combine those of two species (allopolyploidy). Because of functional redundancy, genes are rapidly silenced or lost from the duplicated genomes. Most paleopolyploids, through evolutionary time, have lost their polyploid status through a process called diploidization, and are currently considered diploids, e.g., baker's yeast, Arabidopsis thaliana, and perhaps humans.

Paleopolyploidy is extensively studied in plant lineages. It has been found that almost all flowering plants have undergone at least one round of genome duplication at some point during their evolutionary history. Ancient genome duplications are also found in the early ancestor of vertebrates (which includes the human lineage) near the origin of the bony fishes, and another in the stem lineage of teleost fishes. Evidence suggests that baker's yeast (Saccharomyces cerevisiae), which has a compact genome, experienced polyploidization during its evolutionary history.

The related term mesopolyploid is used for species that have undergone whole genome multiplication events (whole genome duplication, whole genome triplification, etc.) in more recent history, such as within the last 17 million years. Mesopolyploidity is distinguished from paleopolyploidy by its relative ease to detect using surface-level comparative genetics and/or cytogenetic methods such as comparative chromosome painting. The distinction between mesopolyploidy and paleopolyploidy is more recent and not all authors are aware of this term.

== Eukaryotes ==
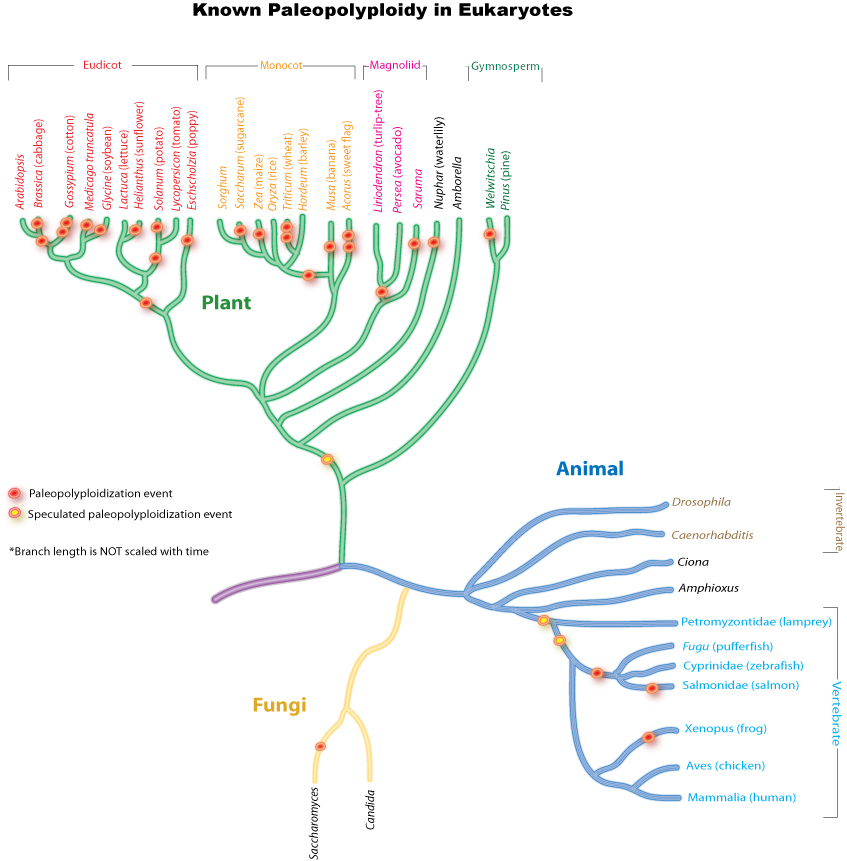
A diagram that summarizes all well-known paleopolyploidization events

Ancient genome duplications are widespread throughout eukaryotic lineages, particularly in plants. Studies suggest that the common ancestor of Poaceae, the grass family which includes important crop species such as maize, rice, wheat, and sugar cane, shared a whole genome duplication (WGD) about 70 million years ago. In more ancient monocot lineages one or likely multiple rounds of additional whole genome duplications had occurred, which were however not shared with the ancestral eudicots. Further independent more recent whole genome duplications have occurred in the lineages leading to maize, sugar cane and wheat, but not the most common cultivar of rice, sorghum or foxtail millet.

A polyploidy event 160 million years ago is theorized to have created the ancestral line that led to all modern flowering plants. That paleopolyploidy event was studied by sequencing the genome of an ancient flowering plant, Amborella trichopoda.

The core eudicots also shared a common whole genome triplication (paleo-hexaploidy), which was estimated to have occurred after monocot-eudicot divergence but before the divergence of rosids and asterids. Many eudicot species have experienced additional whole genome duplications or triplications. For example, the model plant Arabidopsis thaliana, the first plant to have its entire genome sequenced, has experienced at least two additional rounds of whole genome duplication since the duplication shared by the core eudicots. The most recent event took place before the divergence of the Arabidopsis and Brassica lineages, about 20 million years ago to 45 million years ago. Other examples include the sequenced eudicot genomes of apple, soybean, tomato, cotton, etc.

Compared with plants, paleopolyploidy is much rarer in the animal kingdom. It has been identified mainly in amphibians and bony fishes. Although some studies suggested one or more common genome duplications are shared by all vertebrates (including humans), the evidence is not as strong as in the other cases because the duplications, if they exist, happened so long ago (about 400-500 Ma compared to less than 200 Ma in plants), and the matter is still under debate. The idea that vertebrates share a common whole genome duplication is known as the 2R Hypothesis. Many researchers are interested in the reason why animal lineages, particularly mammals, have had so many fewer whole genome duplications than plant lineages.

A well-supported paleopolyploidy has been found in baker's yeast (Saccharomyces cerevisiae), despite its small, compact genome (~13Mbp), after the divergence from Kluyveromyces lactis and K. marxianus. Through genome streamlining, yeast has lost 90% of the duplicated genome over evolutionary time and is now recognized as a diploid organism.

== Detection method ==
Duplicated genes (paralogs) can be identified through sequence homology on the DNA or protein level. Paleopolyploidy can be identified as massive gene duplication at one time using a molecular clock. To distinguish between whole-genome duplication and a collection of (more common) single gene duplication events, the following rules are often applied:

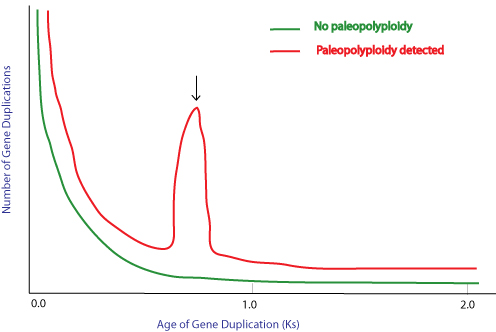
Detection of paleopolyploidy using Ks

- Duplicated genes are located in large duplicated blocks, recognizable by synteny. Single gene duplication is a random process and tends to make duplicated genes scattered throughout the genome. Syntenic arrangements, conserved across many different species and proposed duplicated parts, is powerful evidence of their homology.
- Duplicated blocks are non-overlapping because they were created simultaneously. Segmental duplication within the genome can fulfill the first rule; but multiple independent segmental duplications could overlap each other.

Duplication events that occurred a long time ago in the history of various evolutionary lineages can be difficult to detect because of subsequent diploidization (such that a polyploid starts to behave cytogenetically as a diploid over time) as mutations and gene translations gradually make one copy of each chromosome unlike its counterpart. This usually results in a low confidence for identifying ancient paleopolyploidy.

=== Simpler comparisons ===
Mesopolyploidy, which remains lumped into "paleopolyploidy" by many authors, can be easily distinguished by an all-to-all comparison of gene similarity within one species: the resulting plot of paralogous genes would show obvious, nonoverlapping, syntenic blocks. (An example is figure 2 of Garsmeur et al. 2014.)

Mesopolyploidy can also be detected using cytogenetic methods such as comparative chromosome painting. In mesopolyploidy, diploidization with fusion of chromosomes into a lower haploid number (n) is complete, but the mutations and gene translations have yet to make the similarities non-obvious.

=== Ks ===
In theory, the two duplicated genes should have the same "age"; that is, the divergence of the sequence should be equal between the two genes duplicated by paleopolyploidy (homeologs). Synonymous substitution rate, Ks, is often used as a molecular clock to determine the time of gene duplication. Thus, paleopolyploidy is identified as a "peak" on the duplicate number vs. Ks graph (shown on the right).

However, using Ks plots to identify and document ancient polyploid events can be problematic, as the method fails to identify genome duplications that were followed by massive gene elimination and genome refinement. Other mixed model approaches that combined Ks plots with other methods are being developed to better understand paleopolyploidy.

=== Molecular phylogeny ===
A paleopolyploidy event tends to be shared across a large clade of organisms. As a result, the gene tree (molecular phylogeny of a specific gene family) would indicate a consistent split into two or more clades among these organisms. Combined with synteny evidence (e.g. by using these genes as anchors for aligning pieces of the genome) to rule out the possibility of isolated gene duplication, a polyploidy event can be identified.

== Evolutionary importance ==
Paleopolyploidization events lead to massive cellular changes, including doubling of the genetic material, changes in gene expression and increased cell size. Gene loss during diploidization is not completely random, but heavily selected. Genes from large gene families are duplicated. On the other hand, individual genes are not duplicated. Overall, paleopolyploidy can have both short-term and long-term evolutionary effects on an organism's fitness in the natural environment.

=== Enhanced phenotypic evolution ===
Whole genome duplication may increase the rates and efficiency by which organisms acquire new biological traits. However, one test of this hypothesis, which compared evolutionary rates in innovation in early teleost fishes (with duplicate genomes) to early holostean fishes (without duplicated genomes) found little difference between the two.

=== Genome diversity ===
Genome doubling provided the organism with redundant alleles that can evolve freely with little selection pressure. The duplicated genes can undergo neofunctionalization, subfunctionalization, or nonfunctionalization which could help the organism adapt to the new environment or survive different stress conditions.

=== Hybrid vigor ===
Polyploids often have larger cells and even larger organs. Many important crops, including wheat, maize and cotton, are paleopolyploids which were selected for domestication by ancient peoples.

=== Speciation ===
It has been suggested that many polyploidization events created new species, via a gain of adaptive traits, or by sexual incompatibility with their diploid counterparts. An example would be the recent speciation of allopolyploid Spartina — S. anglica; the polyploid plant is so successful that it is listed as an invasive species in many regions.

== Allopolyploidy and autopolyploidy ==
There are two major divisions of polyploidy, allopolyploidy and autopolyploidy. Allopolyploids arise as a result of the hybridization of two related species, while autopolyploids arise from the duplication of a species' genome as a result of hybridization of two conspecific parents, or somatic doubling in reproductive tissue of a parent. Allopolyploid species are believed to be much more prevalent in nature, possibly because allopolyploids inherit different genomes, resulting in increased heterozygosity, and therefore higher fitness. These different genomes result in an increased likelihood of large genomic reorganizations, which can be either deleterious, or advantageous. Autopolyploidy, however, is generally considered to be a neutral process, though it has been hypothesized that autopolyploidy may serve as a useful mechanism for inducing speciation, and therefore assisting in the ability of an organism to quickly colonize in new habitats without undergoing the time-intensive and costly period of genomic reorganization experienced by allopolyploid species. One common source of autopolyploidy in plants stems from "perfect flowers", which are capable of self-pollination, or "selfing". This, along with errors in meiosis that lead to aneuploidy, can create an environment where autopolyploidy is very likely. This fact can be exploited in a laboratory setting by using colchicine to inhibit chromosome segregation during meiosis, creating synthetic autopolyploid plants.

Following polyploidy events, there are several possible fates for duplicated genes; both copies may be retained as functional genes, change in gene function may occur in one or both copies, gene silencing may mask one or both copies, or complete gene loss may occur. Polyploidy events will result in higher levels of heterozygosity, and, over time, can lead to an increase in the total number of functional genes in the genome. As time passes after a genome duplication event, many genes will change function as a result of either change in duplicate gene function for both allo- and autopolyploid species, or there will be changes in gene expression caused by genomic rearrangements induced by genome duplication in allopolyploids. When both copies of a gene are retained, and thus the number of copies doubled, there is a chance that there will be a proportional increase in expression of that gene, resulting in twice as much mRNA transcript being produced. There is also the possibility that transcription of a duplicated gene will be down-regulated, resulting in less than two-fold increase in transcription of that gene, or that the duplication event will yield more than a two-fold increase in transcription. In one species, Glycine dolichocarpa (a close relative of the soybean, Glycine max), it has been observed that following a genome duplication roughly 500,000 years ago, there has been a 1.4 fold increase in transcription, indicating that there has been a proportional decrease in transcription relative to gene copy number following the duplication event.

Autopolyploidy and allopolyploidy can be distinguished using a gene tree. Another method of distinguishing the two is by the significantly different levels of gene loss (fractionation) that tends to show up in allopolyploidy (between different subgenomes) but not in autopolyploidy (between identical copies).

== Vertebrates as paleopolyploid ==
The hypothesis of vertebrate paleopolyploidy originated as early as the 1970s, proposed by the biologist Susumu Ohno. He reasoned that the vertebrate genome could not achieve its complexity without large scale whole-genome duplications. The "two rounds of genome duplication" hypothesis (2R hypothesis) came about, and gained in popularity, especially among developmental biologists.

Some researchers have questioned the 2R hypothesis because it predicts that vertebrate genomes should have a 4:1 gene ratio compared with invertebrate genomes, and this is not supported by findings from the 48 vertebrate genome projects available in mid-2011. For example, the human genome consists of ~20,500 protein coding genes according to counts from the Ensembl genome browser while an average invertebrate genome size is about 15,000 genes. Additional arguments against 2R were based on the lack of the (AB)(CD) tree topology amongst four members of a gene family in vertebrates. However, if the two genome duplications occurred close together, we would not expect to find this topology.

The amphioxus genome sequence provided support for the hypothesis of two rounds of whole genome duplication, followed by loss of duplicate copies of most genes. Additional amphioxus genomes further strengthen this hypothesis, with many chromosomal segments showing the expected (AB)(CD) tree topology.

A 2015 study generated the sea lamprey genetic map, which yielded strong support for the hypothesis that a single whole-genome duplication occurred in the basal vertebrate lineage, preceded and followed by several evolutionarily independent segmental duplications that occurred over chordate evolution.

A 2021 study sequenced the genome of the Japanese lamprey. It upended the results of the 2015 study and supports the existence of a universal 1R duplication before the Cyclostomata (the extant jawless fish, which includes hagfish and lamprey) and Gnathostomata (jawed fish, which includes the tetrapods, e.g. humans) split. The two lineages then each carried out their own 2R: a duplication/tetraploidization in the jawed fish, a triplication/hexaploidization in the Cyclostomata. A 2024 study sequenced the genome of the brown hagfish and compared it to other vertebrate genomes, both jawed and jawless. The "shared 1R, then separate 2R" framework of the 2021 study is strongly supported by gene tree and synteny. It is also shown that although the 1R event has undergone rediploidization (i.e. homeologous chromosomes stopped recombining, making the genome once again act as diploid) at the Cyclostomata-Gnathostomata split, the Cyclostomata 2R event has not undergone full rediploidization at the time of the hagfish-lamprey split. This helps recontextualize the messy picture found by the 2015 study.

== See also ==
- Gene duplication
- Genomics
- Karyotype
- Ploidy
- Polyploidy
- Speciation
