= Polyembryony =

Development of more than one embryo from a single egg

Polyembryony is the phenomenon of two or more embryos developing from a single fertilized egg. Due to the embryos resulting from the same egg, the embryos are identical to one another, but are genetically diverse from the parents. The genetic difference between the offspring and the parents, but the similarity among siblings, are significant distinctions between polyembryony and the process of budding and typical sexual reproduction. Polyembryony can occur in humans, resulting in identical twins, though the process is random and at a low frequency. Polyembryony occurs regularly in many species of vertebrates, invertebrates, and plants.

== Evolution of polyembryony ==
The evolution of polyembryony and the potential evolutionary advantages that may entail have been studied. In parasitoid wasps, there are several hypotheses surrounding the evolutionary advantages of polyembryony, one of them being that it allows female wasps that are small in size to increase the number of potential offspring in comparison to wasps that are mono embryonic. There are limitations to monoembryony, but with this method of development, multiple embryos can be derived from each of the individual eggs that are laid.

The potential advantages of polyembryony in competing invasive plant species has been studied as well.

== Vertebrates ==
Armadillos are the most well studied vertebrate that undergoes polyembryony, with six species of armadillo in the genus Dasypus that are always polyembryonic. The nine banded armadillo, for instance, always gives birth to four identical young. There are two conditions that are expected to promote the evolution of polyembryony: the mother does not know the environmental conditions of her offspring as in the case of parasitoids, or a constraint on reproduction. It is thought that nine banded armadillos evolved to be polyembryonic because of the latter.

Chondrichthyans, namely the skates Beringraja binoculata and Beringraja pulchra, in addition to spotted catsharks, have exhibited multiple embryos in a single egg case.

== Invertebrates ==
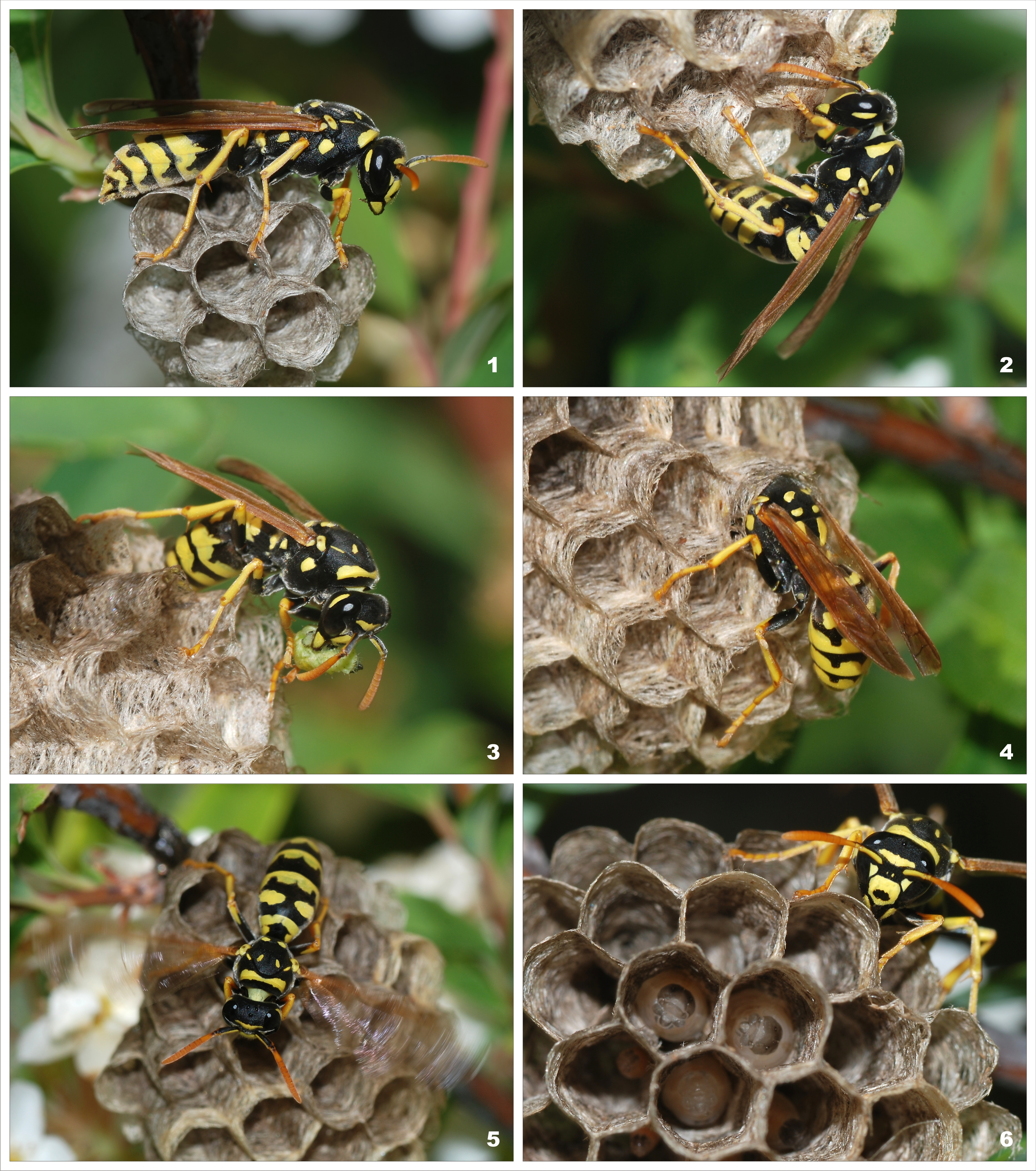
A colony of wasps

A more striking example of the use of polyembryony as a competitive reproductive tool is found in the parasitoid Hymenoptera, family Encyrtidae. The progeny of the splitting embryo develop into at least two forms, those that will develop into adults and those that become a type of soldier, called precocious larvae. These latter larvae patrol the host and kill any other parasitoids they find with the exception of their siblings, usually sisters.

Obligately polyembryonic insects fall in two classes: Hymenoptera (certain wasps), and Strepsiptera. From one egg, these insects can produce over thousands of offspring. Polyembryonic wasps from the Hymenoptera group can be further subdivided into four families including Braconidae (Macrocentrus), Platygastridae (Platygaster), Encyrtidae (Copidosoma), and Dryinidae.

Polyembryony also occurs in Bryozoa. Through genotype analysis and molecular data, it has been suggested that polyembryony happens in the entire bryozoan order Cyclostomatida.

== Plants ==
The term is also used in botany to describe the phenomenon of multiple seedlings emerging from one embryo. Around 20 genera of gymnosperms undergo polyembryony, termed "cleavage polyembryony," where the original zygote splits into many identical embryos. In some plant taxa, the many embryos of polyembryony eventually gives rise to only a single offspring. The mechanism underlying the phenomenon of a resulting single (or in some cases a few) offspring is described in Pinus sylvestris to be programmed cell death (PCD), which removes all but one embryo. Originally, all embryos have equal opportunity to develop into full seeds, but during the early stages of development, one embryo becomes dominant through competition, and therefore the now dormant seed, while the other embryos are destroyed through PCD.

The genus Citrus has a number of species that undergo polyembryony, where multiple nucellar-cell-derived embryos exist alongside sexually derived embryos. Antonie van Leeuwenhoek first described polyembryony in 1719 when the seed in Citrus was observed to have two germinating embryos. In Citrus, polyembryony is genetically controlled by a shared polyembryony locus among the species, determined by single-nucleotide polymorphism in the genotypes sequenced. The variation within the species of citrus is based on the amount of embryos that develop, the impact of the environment, and gene expression. As with other species, due to the many embryos developing in close proximity, competition occurs, which can cause variation in seed success or vigor.

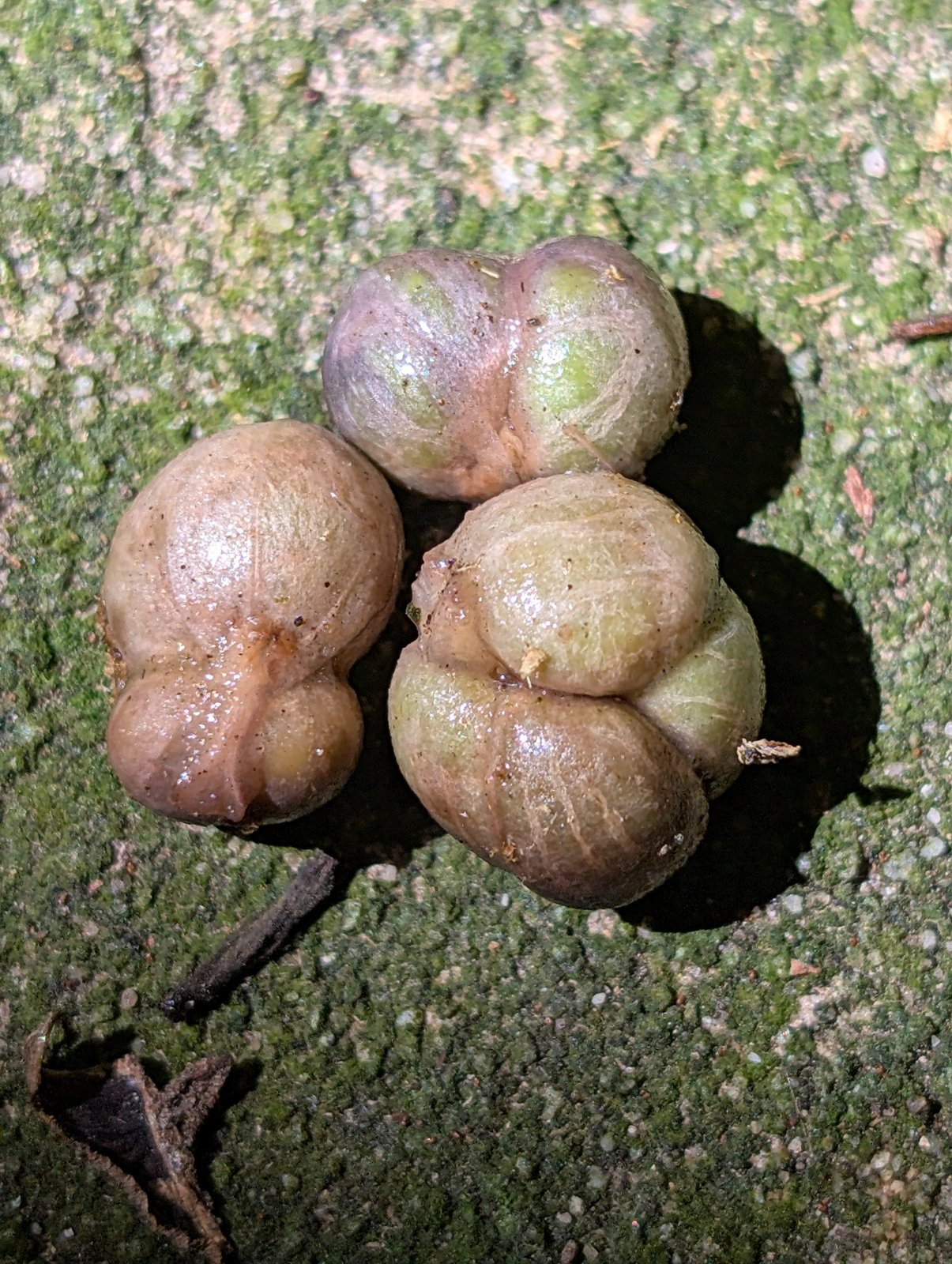
Syzygium seeds with more than one embryo

== See also ==
- Monoembryony
