= Rate of evolution =

Aspect of evolutionary biology

The rate of evolution is quantified as the speed of genetic or morphological change in a lineage over a period of time. The speed at which a molecular entity (such as a protein, gene, etc.) evolves is of considerable interest in evolutionary biology since determining the evolutionary rate is the first step in characterizing its evolution. Calculating rates of evolutionary change is also useful when studying phenotypic changes in phylogenetic comparative biology. In either case, it can be beneficial to consider and compare both genomic (such as DNA sequence) data and paleontological (such as fossil record) data, especially in regards to estimating the timing of divergence events and establishing geological time scales.

== At the organism level ==
In his extensive study of evolution and paleontology, George Gaylord Simpson established evolutionary rates by using the fossil record to count the number of successive genera that occurred within a lineage during a given time period. For example, in studying the evolution of horse (Equus) from Eohippus, he found that eight genera were given rise over the course of approximately 45 million years, which gives a rate of 0.18 genera per million years.

J.B.S. Haldane proposed the first standard unit for morphological evolutionary rate, the darwin (d), which represents a change in measurable trait by a factor of e (the base of natural logarithms) per million years. For example, he found that tooth length during the evolution of the horse changed at an average rate of about 4 × 10^{−8} per year, or 4% per million years.

However, if evolution is dependent upon selection, the generation is a more appropriate unit of time. Therefore, it is more efficient to express rates of evolution in haldane units (H), quantified by standard deviations per generation, indexed by the log of the time interval.

While the generational time scale is considered the time scale of evolution by natural selection, it cannot by itself explain microevolutionary change over multiple generations or macroevolutionary change over geological time. This is due to effects which damp values over longer intervals, as elucidated by morphological rate comparisons which found that there is a negative correlation between rates and measurement interval. Therefore, appropriate temporal scaling is necessary for comparing rates of evolution over different time intervals.

== At the molecular level ==
At the molecular level, the rate of evolution can be characterized by the rate at which new mutations arise within a species or lineage, thus it is typically measured as the number of mutant substitutions over time. These rates vary among both genes and lineages due to gene effects (such as nucleotide composition, among-site variation, etc.), lineage effects (generation time, metabolic rates, etc.), and interactions between the two. Even at the molecular level, population dynamics (such as effective population size) must also be taken into account when considering gene substitution since the rate of fixation of a mutant allele is affected by selective advantage.

=== Estimating mutation rates ===
==== Amino acid substitution ====
Expanding upon the previous findings of Zuckerkandl and Pauling, Kimura found that the rate of amino acid substitution in several proteins is uniform within lineages, and so it can be used to measure the rate of mutant substitution when the time of divergence is known. This is achieved by comparing the amino acid sequence in homologous proteins of related species. He suggested using pauling as the unit of such measurements, which he defined as the rate of substitution of 10^{−9} per amino acid site per year.

==== Nucleotide substitution ====
Underlying the changes in the amino acid sequence of a given protein are changes in nucleotide sequence. Since this process occurs too slowly for direct observation, statistical methods for comparing multiple sequences derived from the sequence a common ancestor are required. The rate of nucleotide substitution is highly variable among genes and gene regions, and is defined as the number of substitutions per site per year with the calculation for mean rate of substitution given as: r = K / 2T (K is the number of substitutions between two homologous sequences and T is the time of divergence between the sequences).

Factors that influence the nucleotide substitution rates of most genes as well as nongenic genomic regions include random genetic drift, purifying selection, and rarely, positive selection. Whether a substitution is synonymous or nonsynonymous is also important when focusing on protein-coding genes, as it has been shown that synonymous substitution rates are much higher than those of nonsynonymous substitutions in most cases. Functional constraint plays a role in the rate of evolution of genes that encode proteins as well, with an inverse relationship likely present.

==== Neutral Theory ====
During his comparative studies of various protein molecules among different groups of organisms, Kimura calculated a nucleotide substitution rate of one nucleotide pair roughly every two years. In reconciling this high rate of nucleotide substitution with the limit set by the substitutional load, he formed the neutral mutation hypothesis. According to this hypothesis, if substitutions are due to the random fixation of selectively neutral or nearly neutral mutations, then the substitution rate is equal to the mutation rate per gamete of the mutants.

=== Molecular Clock Theory ===
The existence of a molecular clock was first posited by Zuckerkandl and Pauling who claimed that in regards to proteins, the evolutionary rate is constant among lineages throughout time. Under this assumption, estimates of substitution rates, r, can be used to infer the timing of species divergence events. In its original form, the molecular clock is not entirely valid as evidenced by variation in evolutionary rates among species and within lineages. However, new models and methods which involve calibrations using geological and fossil data and statistical factors are being developed and may prove to be more accurate for determining time scales which are useful for further understanding of evolutionary rates.

== The effect of artificial selection ==
Humans have created a wide range of new species, and varieties within those species, of both domesticated animals and plants. This has been achieved in a very short geological period of time, spanning only a few tens of thousands of years, and sometimes less. Maize, Zea mays, for instance, is estimated to have been created in what is now known as Mexico in only a few thousand years, starting between about 7,000 and 12,000 years ago, from still uncertain origins. In the light of this extraordinarily rapid rate of evolution, through (prehistoric) artificial selection, George C. Williams and others, have remarked that:

The question of evolutionary change in relation to available geological time is indeed a serious theoretical challenge, but the reasons are exactly the opposite of that inspired by most people's intuition. Organisms in general have not done nearly as much evolving as we should reasonably expect. Long term rates of change, even in lineages of unusual rapid evolution, are almost always far slower than they theoretically could be. The basis for such expectation is to be found most clearly in observed rates of evolution under artificial selection, along with the often high rates of change in environmental conditions that must imply rapid change in intensity and direction of selection in nature.

== Evolvability ==
Evolution is imposed on populations. It is not planned or striven for in some Lamarckist way. The mutations on which the process depends are random events, and, except for the "silent mutations" which do not affect the functionality or appearance of the carrier, are thus usually disadvantageous, and their chance of proving to be useful in the future is vanishingly small. Therefore, while a species or group might benefit from being able to adapt to a new environment by accumulating a wide range of genetic variation, this is to the detriment of the individuals who have to carry these mutations until a small, unpredictable minority of them ultimately contributes to such an adaptation. Thus, the capability to evolve is close to the discredited concept of group selection, since it would be selectively disadvantageous to the individual.

== Overcoming koinophilia ==
If sexual creatures avoid mates with strange or unusual characteristics, in the process called koinophilia, then mutations that affect the external appearance of their carriers will seldom be passed on to the next and subsequent generations. They will therefore seldom be tested by natural selection. Evolution is, therefore, effectively halted or slowed down considerably. The only mutations that can accumulate in a population are ones that have no noticeable effect on the outward appearance and functionality of their bearers (i.e., they are "silent" or "neutral mutations", which can be, and are, used to trace the relatedness and age of populations and species.)

This implies that evolution can only occur when mutant mates cannot be avoided, as a result of a severe scarcity of potential mates. This is most likely to occur in small, isolated communities. These occur most commonly on small islands, in remote valleys, lakes, river systems, or caves, or during the aftermath of a mass extinction. Under these circumstances, not only is the choice of mates severely restricted but population bottlenecks, founder effects, genetic drift and inbreeding cause rapid, random changes in the isolated population's genetic composition. Furthermore, hybridization with a related species trapped in the same isolate might introduce additional genetic changes. If an isolated population such as this survives its genetic upheavals, and subsequently expands into an unoccupied niche, or into a niche in which it has an advantage over its competitors, a new species, or subspecies, will have come in being. In geological terms this will be an abrupt event. A resumption of avoiding mutant mates will, thereafter, result, once again, in evolutionary stagnation.

== Fossil record ==
Alternative explanations of the pattern of evolution observed in the fossil record. While apparently instantaneous change may look like macromutation, gradual evolution by natural selection could readily give the same effect, since 10,000 years barely registers in the fossil record.

The fossil record of an evolutionary progression typically consists of punctuated equilibrium, with species that suddenly appear, as if by macromutation, and ultimately disappear, in many cases close to a million years later, without any change in external appearance. This is compatible with evolution by smaller mutational steps because periods of a few tens of thousands of years can barely be distinguished in the fossil record: relatively rapid evolution will always appear as a sudden change in a sequence of fossils. Charles Darwin indeed noted in On the Origin of Species that periods of change would be short compared to the overall existence of a species. In general, morphological changes are too rapid to determine from which cotemporal species a new species originated, as seen in the evolution of modern humans.
