= Deterioration =

Deterioration may refer to:

- Worsening of health
- Physical wear

== See also ==
- Decadence (disambiguation)
- Degeneracy (disambiguation)
- Deteriorata, a parody of Desiderata
- Decay
- Decline
