= Missense mutation =

Genetic point mutation that results in an amino acid change in a protein

In genetics, a missense mutation is a point mutation in which a single nucleotide change results in a codon that codes for a different amino acid. It is a type of nonsynonymous substitution. Missense mutations change amino acids, which in turn alter proteins and may alter a protein's function or structure. These mutations may arise spontaneously from mutagens like UV radiation, tobacco smoke, an error in DNA replication, and other factors. Screening for missense mutations can be done by sequencing the genome of an organism and comparing the sequence to a reference genome to analyze for differences. Missense mutations can be repaired by the cell when there are errors in DNA replication by using mechanisms such as DNA proofreading and mismatch repair. They can also be repaired by using genetic engineering technologies or pharmaceuticals. Some notable examples of human diseases caused by missense mutations are Rett syndrome, cystic fibrosis, and sickle-cell disease.

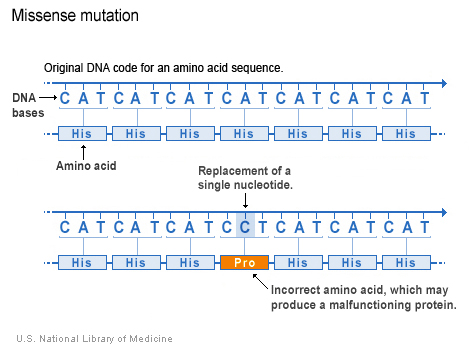
This image shows an example of missense mutation. One of the nucleotides (adenine) is replaced by another nucleotide (cytosine) in the DNA sequence. This results in an incorrect amino acid (proline) being incorporated into the protein sequence.

== Impact on protein function ==
Missense mutation refers to a change in one amino acid in a protein arising from a point mutation in a single nucleotide. Amino acids are the building blocks of proteins. Missense mutations are a type of nonsynonymous substitution in a DNA sequence. Two other types of nonsynonymous substitutions are nonsense mutations, in which a codon is changed to a premature stop codon that results in the resulting protein being cut short, and nonstop mutations, in which a stop codon deletion results in a longer but nonfunctional protein. The latter two types are not considered to be missense mutations.

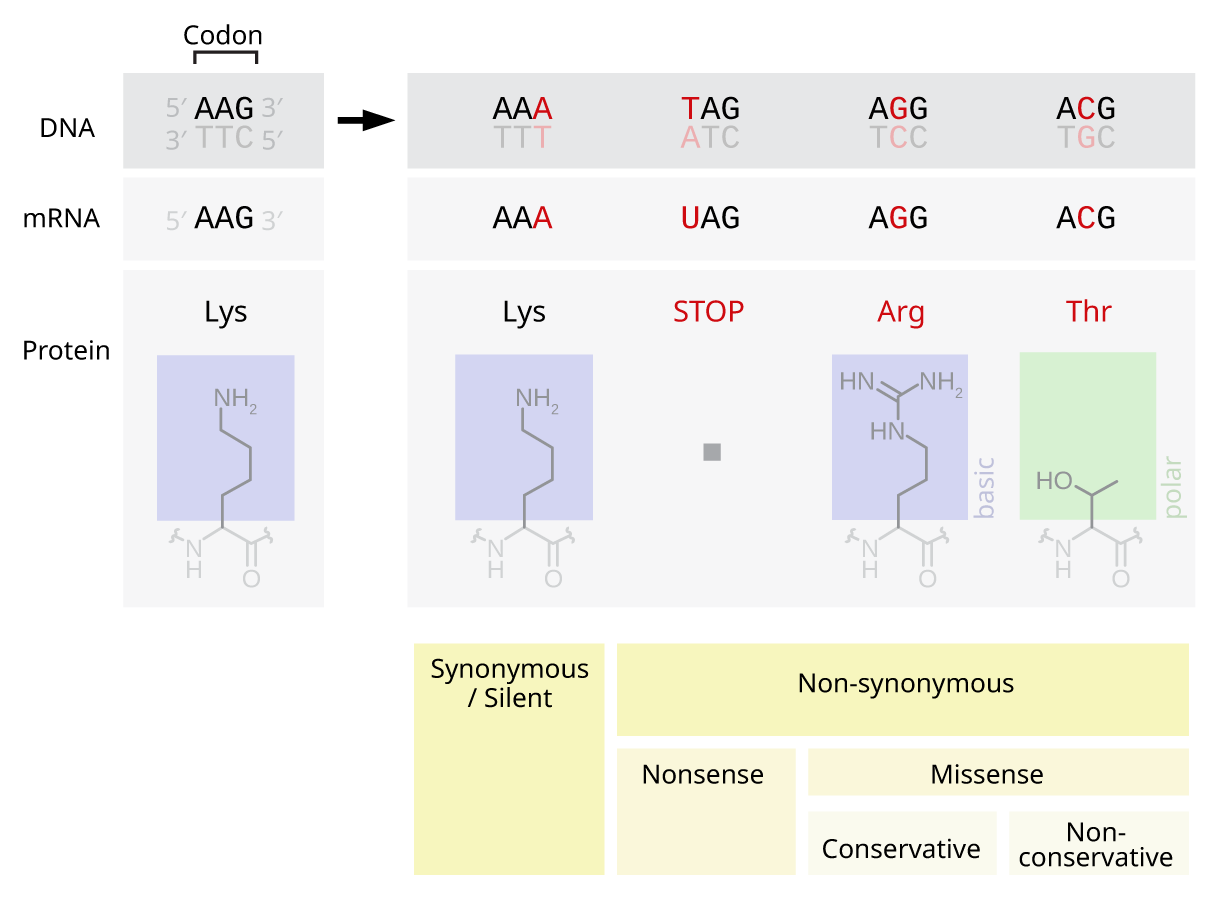
Point mutation categories. Missense mutations are a type of nonsynonymous point mutation.

Missense mutations can render the resulting protein nonfunctional, due to misfolding of the protein. These mutations are responsible for human diseases, such as Epidermolysis bullosa, sickle-cell disease, SOD1 mediated ALS, and a substantial number of cancers.

Not all missense mutations lead to appreciable protein changes. An amino acid may be replaced by a different amino acid of very similar chemical properties in which case the protein may still function normally; this is termed a conservative mutation. Alternatively, the amino acid substitution could occur in a region of the protein which does not significantly affect the protein secondary structure or function. Lastly, when more than one codon codes for the same amino acid (termed "degenerate coding"), the resulting mutation does not produce any change in translation and hence no change in protein is observed; degenerate coding would be classified as a synonymous substitution, or a silent mutation, and not a missense mutation.

== Origin ==
Missense mutations may be inherited or arise spontaneously, termed de novo mutations. Well studied diseases arising from inherited missense mutations include sickle cell anemia, cystic fibrosis, and early-onset Alzheimer's and Parkinson's disease. De novo mutations that increase or decrease the activity of synapses have been implicated in the development of neurological and developmental disorders, such a Autism Spectrum Disorder and intellectual delay.

=== Agents of spontaneous missense mutation ===
Environmental mutagens, such as tobacco smoke or UV radiation, may be a cause of spontaneous missense mutations. Tobacco smoke has been implicated in transversion mutations in the K-ras gene, with a meta-analysis of lung carcinomas showing 25 tumours containing a G to T mutation causing an amino acid change from glycine to cysteine, and 11 tumours with a G to T mutation causing an amino acid change from glycine to valine. Similarly, numerous studies have shown ultraviolet light induces missense mutations in the p53 gene, which when unregulated, reduces the cell's ability to recognize DNA damage and engage in apoptosis, leading to cell proliferation and potential skin carcinogenesis.

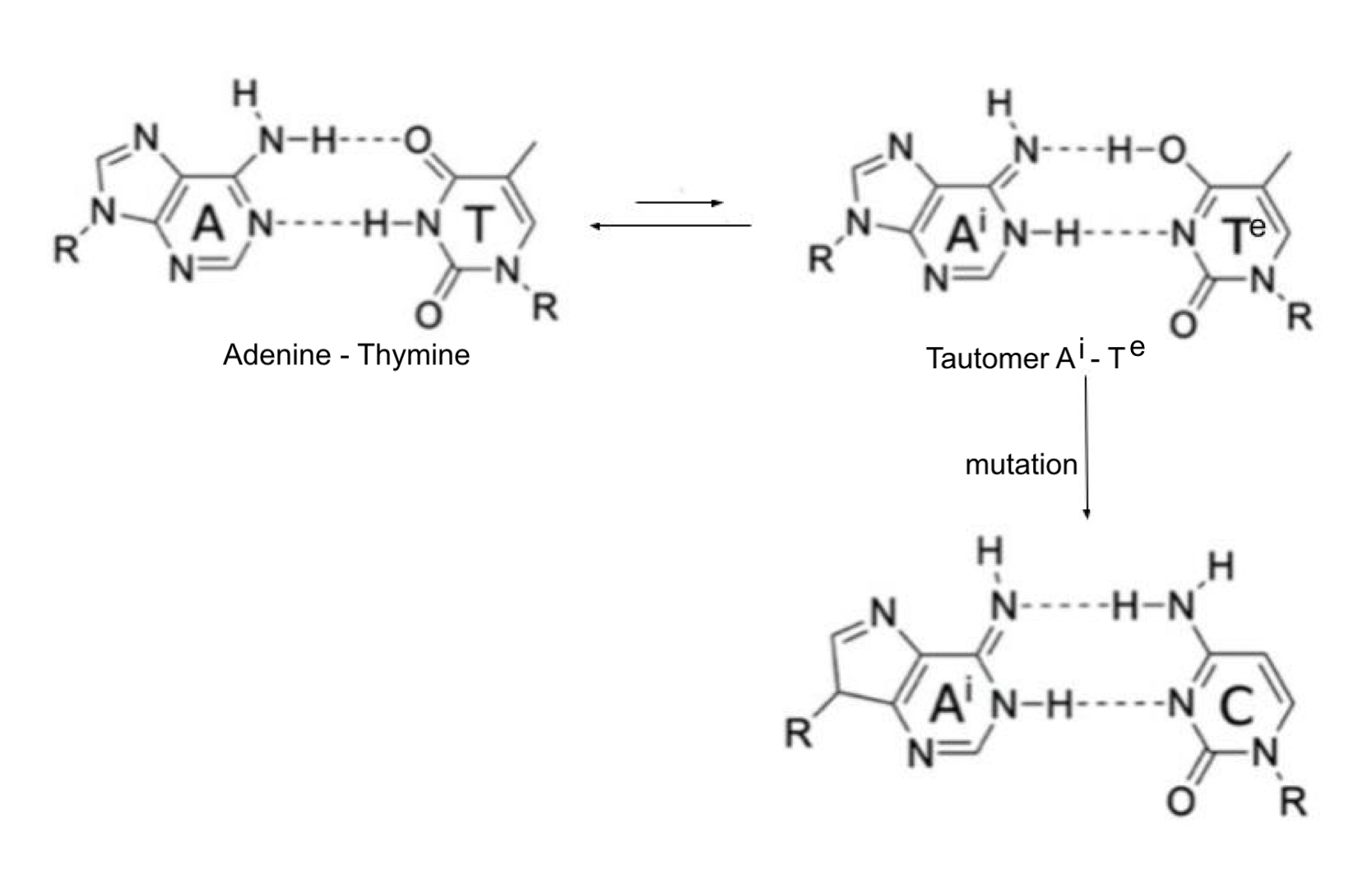
Spontaneous tautomerization of adenine, resulting in adenine mispairing with cytosine, rather than thymine, after replication. Future replications would lead to cytosine pairing with guanine, instead of an adenine-thymine pair in that location, resulting in a missense mutation.

DNA polymerase replication errors during cell division may lead to spontaneous missense mutations if DNA polymerase's proofreading ability does not detect and repair an error it makes. Spontaneous DNA polymerase errors are estimated to occur at a frequency of 1/10^{9} base pairs.

Although rarer, tautomerization of bases also creates spontaneous missense mutations. Tautomerization occurs when hydrogen atoms on DNA bases spontaneously change locations, impacting the structure of the base, and allowing it to pair with an incorrect base. If this strand of DNA is replicated, the incorrect base will be the template for a new strand, leading to a mutation, possibly changing the amino acid and therefore, the protein. For example, Wang et al., (2011) used X-ray cystallography to demonstrate that a de novo mutation was created when DNA repair mechanisms did not recognize a C-A base mismatch due to tautomerization allowing the base structures to be compatible.

== Screening ==
=== Next Generation Sequencing (NGS) ===
Next Generation Sequencing (NGS) has changed the world of sequencing by decreasing the cost of sequencing and increasing the throughput. It does this by utilizing massively parallel sequencing to sequence the genome. This involves clonally amplified DNA fragments that can be spatially separated into second generation sequencing (SGS) or third generation sequencing (TGS) platforms. There is variation between these protocols, but the overall methods are similar. Using massively parallel sequencing allows the NGS platform to produce very large sequences in a single run. The DNA fragments are typically separated by length using gel electrophoresis.

NGS consists of four main steps, DNA isolation, target enrichment, sequencing, and data analysis. The DNA isolation step involves breaking the genomic DNA into many small fragments. There are many different mechanisms that can be used to accomplish this such as mechanical methods, enzymatic digestion, and more. This step also consists of adding adaptors to either end of the DNA fragments that are complementary to the flow cell oligos and include primer binding sites for the target DNA. The target enrichment step amplifies the region of interest. This includes creating a complementary strand to the DNA fragments through hybridization to a flow cell oligo. It then gets denatured and bridge amplification occurs before the reverse strand is finally washed and sequencing can occur. The sequencing step involves massive parallel sequencing of all DNA fragments simultaneously using a NGS sequencer. This information is saved and analyzed in the last step, data analysis, using bioinformatics software. This compares the sequences to a reference genome to align the fragments and show mutations in the targeted area of the sequence.

=== Newborn Screening (NBS) ===
Newborn screening (NBS) for missense mutations is increasingly incorporating genomic technologies in addition to traditional biochemical methods to improve the detection of genetic disorders early in life. Traditional NBS primarily relies on biochemical assays, such as tandem mass spectrometry, to detect metabolic abnormalities indicative of conditions like phenylketonuria or congenital hypothyroidism. However, these methods may miss genetic causes or produce ambiguous results. To address these deficiencies, next-generation sequencing (NGS) is being added to NBS programs. For instance, targeted gene panels and whole-exome sequencing (WES) are used to identify disease causing missense mutations in genes associated with treatable conditions, such as severe combined immunodeficiency (SCID) and cystic fibrosis. Studies like the BabyDetect project have demonstrated the utility of genomic screening in identifying disorders missed by conventional methods, with actionable results for conditions affecting more than 400 genes. In addition, genomic approaches allow for the detection of rare or recessive conditions that may not manifest biochemically at birth, significantly expanding the scope of diseases screened. These advancements align with the established principles of NBS, which emphasize early detection and intervention to prevent morbidity and mortality.

== Prevention and repair mechanisms ==
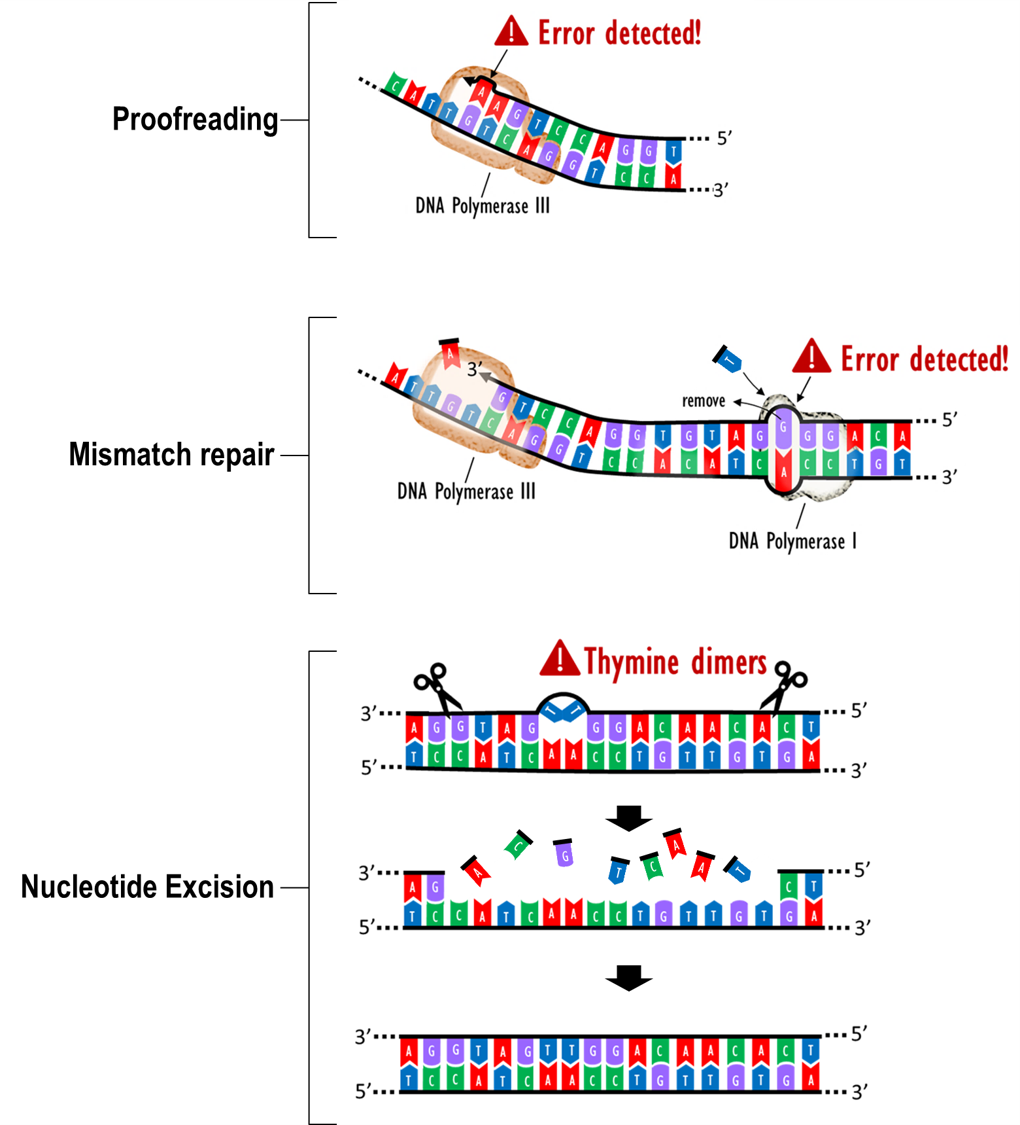
Three mechanisms of DNA repair are represented in simplified form. DNA proofreading and mismatch repair are used to fix missense mutations. Nucleotide excision repair is used to repair large DNA lesions, not missense mutations.

=== Cellular mechanisms ===
DNA polymerases, used in DNA replication, have a high specificity of 10^{4} to 10^{6}-fold in base pairing. They have proofreading abilities to correct incorrect matches, allowing 90-99.9% of mismatches to be excised and repaired. The base mismatches that go unnoticed are repaired by the DNA mismatch repair pathway, also inherent in cells. The DNA mismatch repair pathway uses exonucleases that move along the DNA strand and remove the incorrectly incorporated base in order for DNA polymerase to fill in the correct base.Exonuclease1 is involved in many DNA repair systems and moves 5' to 3' on the DNA strand.

=== Genetic engineering and drug-based interventions ===
More recently, research has explored the use of genetic engineering and pharmaceuticals as potential treatments. tRNA therapies have emerged in research studies as a potential missense mutation treatment, following evidence supporting their use in nonsense mutation correction. Missense-correcting tRNAs are engineered to identify the mutated codon, but carry the correct charged amino acid which is inserted into the nascent protein.

Pharmaceuticals that target specific proteins affected by missense mutations have also shown therapeutic potential. Pharmaceutical studies have particularly focused on targeting the p53 mutant protein and Ca^{2+} channel abnormalities, both caused by gain of function missense mutations due to their high prevalence in a number of cancers and genetic diseases respectively. In cystic fibrosis, most commonly caused by missense mutations, drugs known as modulators target the defective Cystic fibrosis transmembrane conductance regulator (CFTR) protein. For example, to reduce the defects caused by class III CFTR mutations, Ivacaftor, part of the modulator Kalydeco, forces the chloride channel to remain in an open position.

=== Future technology and research ===
Gene therapy is being explored as a treatment for missense mutations. This involves inserting the correct sequence of DNA into an incorrect gene. Artificial Intelligence programs, such as AlphaFold, are also being developed to predict the effect of missense mutations. Identifying potential deleterious mutations can assist with disease diagnosis and treatment.

== Evolution ==
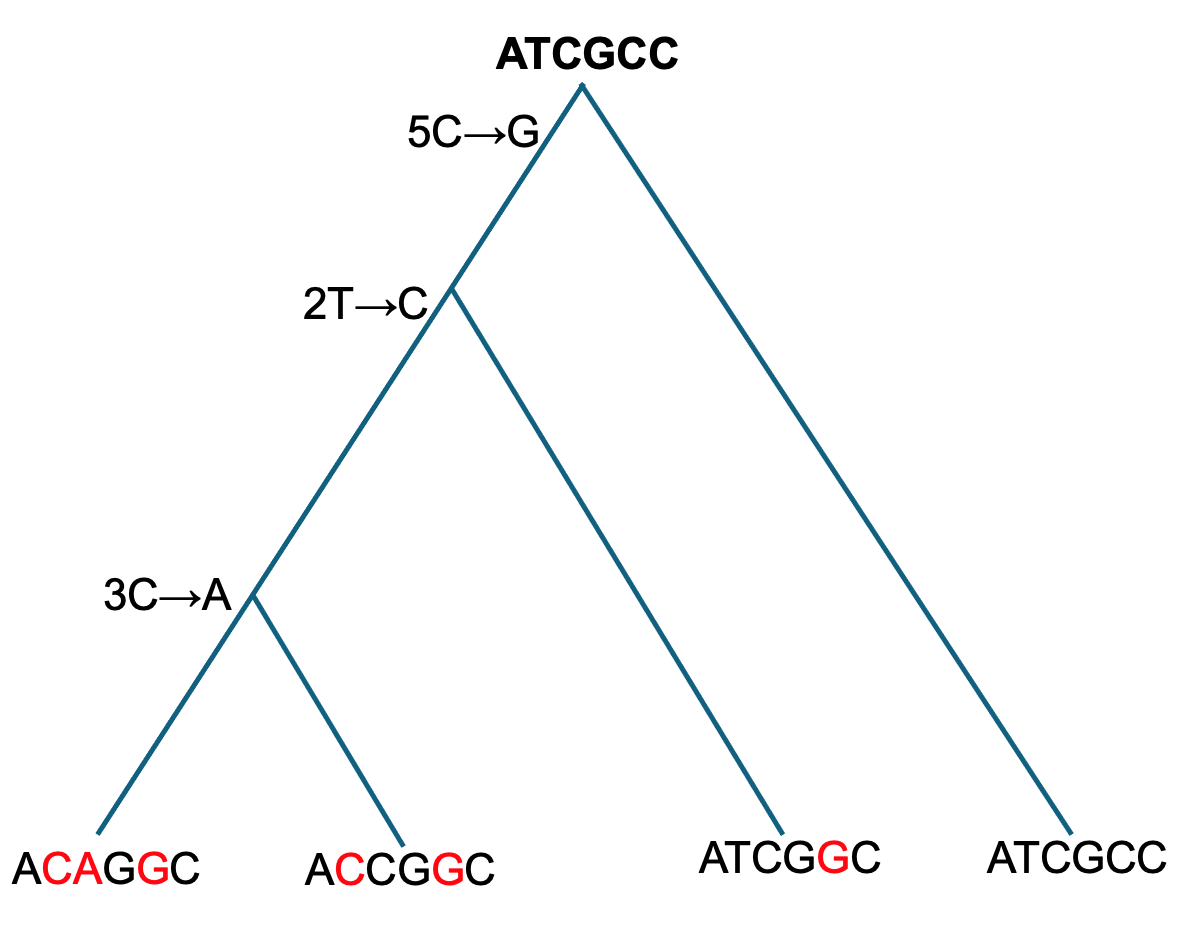
Diverged nucleotide sequence demonstrating how sequences diverge over time. Red letters are nucleotides changed from the original sequence.

If a missense mutation is not deleterious, it will not be selected against and can contribute to species divergence. Over time, mutations occur randomly in individuals and can become fixed in populations if they are not selected against. Missense mutations are a type of mutation that are not neutral, and therefore can be acted on by selection. Selection cannot act on synonymous mutations (mutations that do not change anything phenotypically).

Tracking missense mutations, like nonsynonymous SNPs, in ancestral species populations allow genealogies and phylogenetic trees to be created and evolutionary connections to be made. Missense mutation analysis is often used in evolutionary genetics to create relationships between species, as amino acid changes leading to protein changes are needed for species to diverge from each other.

== Notable examples ==
=== LMNA ===
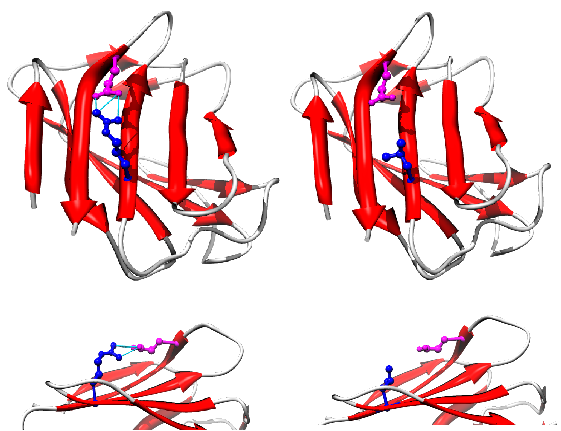
Wild type (left) and mutated (right) form of lamin A (pdb id: 1IFR). Normally, Arginine 527 (blue) forms salt bridge with glutamate 537 (magenta), but R527L substitution results in breaking this interaction (leucine has a nonpolar tail and therefore cannot form a static salt bridge).

    DNA: 5' - AAC AGC CTG CGT ACG GCT CTC - 3'
         3' - TTG TCG GAC GCA TGC CGA GAG - 5'
   mRNA: 5' - AAC AGC CUG CGU ACG GCU CUC - 3'
Protein:      Asn Ser Leu Arg Thr Ala Leu

LMNA missense mutation (c.1580G>T) introduced at LMNA gene – position 1580 (nt) in the DNA sequence (CGT) causing the guanine to be replaced with the thymine, yielding CTT in the DNA sequence. This results at the protein level in the replacement of the arginine by the leucine at the position 527. This leads to destruction of salt bridge and structure destabilization. At phenotype level this manifests with overlapping mandibuloacral dysplasia and progeria syndrome.

The resulting transcript and protein product is:

    DNA: 5' - AAC AGC CTG CTT ACG GCT CTC - 3'
         3' - TTG TCG GAC GAA TGC CGA GAG - 5'
   mRNA: 5' - AAC AGC CUG CUU ACG GCU CUC - 3'
Protein:      Asn Ser Leu Leu Thr Ala Leu

=== Rett Syndrome ===
Missense mutations in the MeCP2 protein can cause Rett syndrome, otherwise known as the RTT phenotype. This phenotype primarily effects females, as males do not live with this mutation past infancy. T158M, R306C and R133C are the most common missense mutations causing RTT. T158M is a mutation of an adenine being substituted for a guanine causing the threonine at amino acid position 158 being substituted with a methionine. R133C is a mutation of a cytosine at base position 417 in the gene encoding the MeCP2 protein being substituted for a thymine, causing an amino acid substitution at position 133 in the protein of arginine with cysteine.

=== Sickle Cell ===
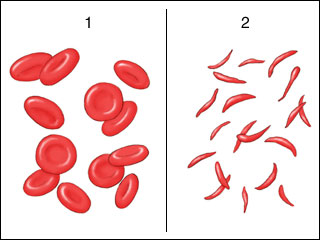
(1) Normal red blood cells and (2) sickled-cell red blood cells

Sickle-cell disease changes the shape of red blood cells from round to sickle shaped. In the most common variant of sickle-cell disease, the 20th nucleotide of the gene for the beta chain of hemoglobin is altered from the codon GAG to GTG. Thus, the 6th amino acid, glutamic acid, is substituted by valine—notated as an "E6V" or a "Glu6Val" mutation—which causes the protein to be sufficiently altered with a sickle-cell phenotype. The affected cells cause issues in the bloodstream as they can become sticky due to their improper ion transport leading to them being susceptible to water loss. This can cause a buildup of blood cells that obstructs blood flow to any organ in the body.

=== Other conditions that can be caused by missense mutations ===
- Alzheimers
- X-linked intellectual disability
- Hypocholesterolemia
- Tangier disease
- Congenital nemaline myopathy

== See also ==
- Ka/Ks ratio
- Missense mRNA
- Nonsense mutation
