= Missense mRNA =

Messenger RNA with at least one mutated codon

Missense mRNA is a messenger RNA bearing one or more mutated codons that yield polypeptides with an amino acid sequence different from the wild-type or naturally occurring polypeptide. Missense mRNA molecules are created when template DNA strands or the mRNA strands themselves undergo a missense mutation in which a protein coding sequence is mutated and an altered amino acid sequence is coded for.

== Biogenesis ==
A missense mRNA arises from a missense mutation, in the event of which a DNA nucleotide base pair in the coding region of a gene is changed such that it results in the substitution of one amino acid for another. The point mutation is nonsynonymous because it alters the RNA codon in the mRNA transcript such that translation results in amino acid change. An amino acid change may not result in appreciable changes in protein structure depending on whether the amino acid change is conservative or non-conservative. This owes to the similar physicochemical properties exhibited by some amino acids.

Missense mRNAs may be detected as a result of two different types of point mutations - spontaneous mutations and induced mutations. Spontaneous mutations occur during the DNA replication process where a non-complementary nucleotide is deposited by the DNA polymerase in the extension phase. The consecutive round of replication would result in a point mutation. If the resulting mRNA codon is one that changes the amino acid, a missense mRNA would be detected. A hypergeometric distribution study involving DNA polymerase β replication errors in the APC gene revealed 282 possible substitutions that could result in missense mutations. When the APC mRNA was analyzed in the mutational spectrum, it showed 3 sites where the frequency of substitutions were high.

Induced mutations caused by mutagens can give rise to missense mutations. Nucleoside analogues such as 2-aminopurine and 5-bromouracil can insert in place of A and T respectively. Ionizing radiation like x-rays and γ-rays can deaminate cytosine to uracil.

Missense mRNAs may be applied synthetically in forward and reverse genetic screens used to interrogate the genome. Site-directed mutagenesis is a technique often employed to create knock-in and knock-out models that express missense mRNAs. For example, in knock-in studies, human orthologs are identified in model organisms to introduce missense mutations, or a human gene with a substitution mutation is integrated into the genome of the model organism. The subsequent loss-of-function or gain-of-function phenotypes are measured to model genetic diseases and discover novel drugs. While homologous recombination has been widely used to generate single-base substitutions, novel technologies that co-inject gRNA and hCas9 mRNA of the CRISPR/Cas9 system, in conjunction with single-strand oligodeoxynucleotide (ssODN) donor sequences have shown efficiency in generating point mutations in the genome.

== Evolutionary implications ==
=== Non-synonymous RNA editing ===
Substitutions can occur on the level of both the DNA and RNA. RNA editing-dependent amino acid substitutions can produce missense mRNA's of which occur through hydrolytic deaminase reactions. Two of the most prevalent deaminase reactions occur through the Apolipoprotein B mRNA editing enzyme (APOBEC) and the adenosine deaminase acting on RNA enzyme (ADAR) which are responsible for the conversion of cytidine to uridine (C-to-U), and the deamination of adenosine to inosine (A-to-I), respectively. Such selective substitutions of uridine for cytidine, and inosine for adenosine in RNA editing can produce differential isoforms of missense mRNA transcripts, and confer transcriptome diversity and enhanced protein function in response to selective pressures.

== See also ==
- Nonsense mutation
- Start codon
- Stop codon
