= OR10G4 =

Protein-coding gene in the species Homo sapiens

Identifiers
- Aliases: OR10G4, OR11-278, olfactory receptor family 10 subfamily G member 4
- External IDs: MGI: 3030814; GeneCards: OR10G4

Gene location (Human)
Chr.	Chromosome 11 (human)
Band	11q24.2	Start	124,012,997 bp
Band	11q24.2	End	124,018,732 bp

Gene location (Mouse)
Chr.	Chromosome 9 (mouse)
Band	9|9 A5.1	Start	39,915,644 bp
Band	9|9 A5.1	End	39,920,878 bp
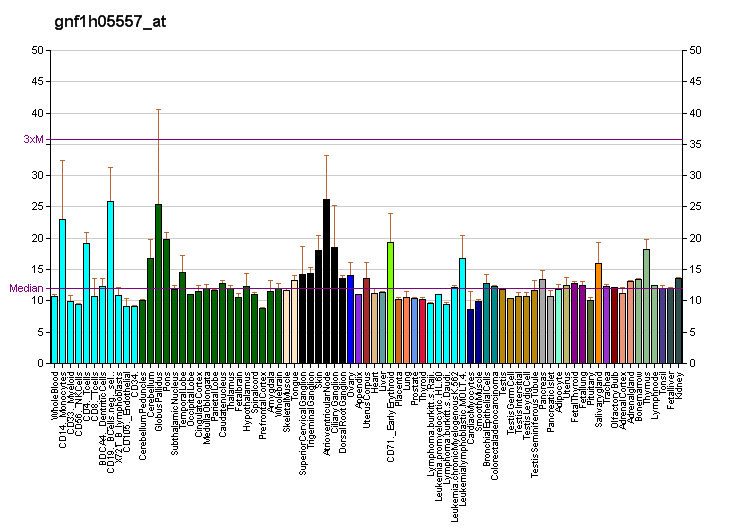
RNA expression pattern
Bgee	Human / Mouse (ortholog); Top expressed in: testicle; body of pancreas; mucosa of transverse colon; placenta; rectum / n/a; More reference expression data
BioGPS	More reference expression data
Gene ontology
Molecular function	G protein-coupled receptor activity; signal transducer activity; olfactory receptor activity
Cellular component	plasma membrane; membrane; integral component of membrane
Biological process	signal transduction; response to stimulus; sensory perception of smell; detection of chemical stimulus involved in sensory perception of smell; G protein-coupled receptor signaling pathway
Sources:Amigo / QuickGO
Orthologs
Databases	NCBI: entry; OMA: entry
Species	Human	Mouse
Entrez	390264	259110
Ensembl	ENSG00000254737	ENSMUSG00000060254
UniProt	Q8NGN3	Q8VH08
RefSeq (mRNA)	NM_001004462	NM_147106
RefSeq (protein)	NP_001004462	NP_667317
Location (UCSC)	Chr 11: 124.01 – 124.02 Mb	Chr 9: 39.92 – 39.92 Mb
PubMed search
- Wikidata
View/Edit Human	View/Edit Mouse

Olfactory receptor 10G4 is a protein that in humans is encoded by the OR10G4 gene.

Olfactory receptors interact with odorant molecules in the nose, to initiate a neuronal response that triggers the perception of a smell. The olfactory receptor proteins are members of a large family of G-protein-coupled receptors (GPCR) arising from single coding-exon genes. Olfactory receptors share a 7-transmembrane domain structure with many neurotransmitter and hormone receptors and are responsible for the recognition and G protein-mediated transduction of odorant signals. The olfactory receptor gene family is the largest in the genome. The nomenclature assigned to the olfactory receptor genes and proteins for this organism is independent of other organisms.

== Genetic differences ==
Nonsynonymous substitutions in the OR10G4 gene have a significant effect on the perception of the "smoky" odorant guaiacol. Individuals with mutations that reduce the affinity of the OR10G4 receptor for guaiacol have a reduced sensitivity to it, and the same people who report guaiacol as weaker tend to rate it as more pleasant.

== See also ==
- Olfactory receptor
