= Devolution (disambiguation) =

Devolution is the transfer of powers from a central government to a regional or a constituent national government.

Devolution, Devolve, or Devolved may also refer to:

== Arts and media ==
- Devolution (album), an album by M.O.D.
- Devolution (band), an American industrial metal band
- D.E.V.O.L.U.T.I.O.N., an album by Destruction
- "Devolution", a song by French electronic musician Electrosexual
- "De-evolution", an artistic concept and satirical "theory" of culture espoused by Devo
- Devolution, an album by De/Vision
- Devolved (band), a technical death metal band
- Devolve (EP), a 1990 rock album by Shihad
- Devolution (Brooks novel), a 2020 novel by Max Brooks

== Other uses ==
- Devolution (biology), an evolutionary hypothesis
- Hindu views on evolution, including the Hindu devolution hypothesis
- The War of Devolution between France and Spain (1667–1668)
