= Decadence (disambiguation) =

Decadence refers to a personal trait, or to the state of a society (or segment of it).

Decadence or Decadent may also refer to:

- Decadence (band), a Swedish metal band
- Decadence (TV series), a television documentary
- Decadence (album), a 2004 album by Head Automatica
- "Decadence", a song by Pet Shop Boys from the album Alternative
- Decadence, a play by Steven Berkoff
- Decadence (film), a 1994 film
- Decadence (novel), a 1925 novel by Maxim Gorky
- Decadent movement, an art movement of the late 19th century
- Decadent (band), a South Korean indie rock band
- Decadent (U.D.O. album), 2015
- Decadent, 1999 album by Threshold
- Decadent (Decadent album), 2018
- "Decadence" a song by Disturbed from the album Ten Thousand Fists
- "Decadance", a song by Living Colour from the album The Chair in the Doorway
- Deca-Dence, a 2020 anime television series
