= Decadent (Decadent album) =

2018 album by Decadent

Studio album by Decadent
- Released: May 30, 2018
- Genre: Indie rock, blues rock
- Length: 46:45
- Label: Poclanos
- Producer: Decadent

Decadent chronology
É (2017)	Decadent (2018)	Lingu / Talus (2019)

Decadent is the first and only studio album by South Korean indie rock band Decadent. The album was released on 30 May 2018.

== Background ==
After the band's EP É in 2017, they worked on their first studio album. The tracks Peter Parker (피터 파커) and Tomato Homicide (토마토 살인사건), which were decided to be excluded from the É tracks, were included in the album. The album is a concept album, and the album is divided into the first part of "Inside," where the speaker cuts himself off from the outside world where disease is prevalent, and the second part of "Outside," which the speaker, who has been observing the outside through the window inside, experiences and feels as he goes out. The first track on the album Disease (병) was made with a music video and was made in stop motion.

== Critical reception ==
Professional ratings
Review scores
Source	Rating
Music Y	4/5 stars

Park Byeongwoon of Music Y described the album as "The spectacles that sometimes stir with brush strokes of progressive/experimental based on the black music." The member of the selection committee for the Korean Music Awards Lee Kyeongjoon reviewed, "Decadent is an album that breaks down the boundaries between rock and modern rock. It mixes post-punk, soul and jazz like illusions," and the album was nominated for Best Modern Rock Album of 2019. Web magazine Tonplein described the Tomato Homicide (토마토 살인사건), the track of the album, as "the track that represents us in the South Korea where we live by suppressing the anger that we want to kill, smash, and overthrow everything, and faces the present of the country."

== Track listing ==
No.	Title	Length
1.	"Disease" ("병")	3:40
2.	"Footnote" ("각주")	5:15
3.	"La Tomatina" ("라 토마티나")	1:09
4.	"Tomato Homicide" ("토마토 살인사건")	4:29
5.	"Cromatic Sensatio" ("색채감각")	5:50
6.	"Salome" ("살로메")	4:41
7.	"Tonsure" ("삭발")	3:54
8.	"The Window" ("창")	2:01
9.	"Ausgang" ("외출")	2:42
10.	"Spaziergang" ("산책")	2:46
11.	"Peter Parker" ("피터 파커")	5:04
12.	"B"	5:14
