= Decadent (band) =

South Korean indie rock band

- Origin: Seoul, South Korea
- Genres: Indie rock; blues rock
- Years active: 2016-2019, 2025-present
- Past members: Jin Dongwook; Park Changhyeon; Seol Yeongin; Lee Hyeonseok

Decadent (Korean: 데카당) is a South Korean indie rock band. The band formed in 2016. Their only studio album, Decadent (2018), was nominated for the Best Modern Rock Album at the 2019 Korean Music Awards.

== History ==
Decadent was formed in Hyehwa-dong, Seoul in May 2016 by high school alumni. They released an EP É (ㅔ) on 4 May 2017. Weiv's Na Wonyoung described the band as "A group that "crossover" the world in their own way." They won the Penta Super Rookie hosted at the Pentaport Rock Festival in 2017, and performed at the festival.

Their debut self-title studio album was released in 2018, and held an exhibition. They made it to the final round of the 2018 EBS Hello Rookie Contest with KOCCA hosted by Educational Broadcasting System and Korea Creative Content Agency, and won third place. The album was nominated for the Best Modern Rock Album at the 2019 Korean Music Awards.

Decadent announced their disbandment in 2019, and were scheduled to give their final performance at the 2019 Jisan Rock Festival, but it did not happen as the festival was cancelled. The vocalist Jin Dongwook later debuted as a solo musician and released his first studio album DFMO in 2019.

The member of the selection committee for the Korean Music Awards Lee Kyeongjoon described the band as "For those who loved indie rock, Decadent was irreplaceable, and more than anyone else, I regret the dissolution of Decadent and look forward to the music each of the four members will create.", and nominated their single Lingu for the 2020 Korean Music Awards for Best Modern Rock Song.

Decadent announced the reunion in 2025 and released the single Agog / Cushion No.1.

== Discography ==
=== Studio albums ===
- Decadent (2018)

=== EPs ===
- É (ㅔ) (2017)
- Lingu / Talus (2019)
