= Devolution (band) =

- Origin: Tampa, Florida, United States
- Genres: Industrial metal, breakbeat, electronica
- Years active: 1996–present
- Labels: Independent

Devolution is an American-based industrial metal band, created by Mykill Mayhem. The first release from Devolution, entitled "Cerebrequiem", was in the genre of death metal and was released in 1996, featuring session musicians assembled from Mykill's previous band, Astaroth. Singer Larry Sapp (also a member of Brutality) performed vocals, and Tony Laureano (also a member of Malevolent Creation, Dimmu Borgir, and Angelcorpse, and several other death metal bands) recorded the drums for the CD. Another death metal album was written, but technical difficulties and Laureano's touring schedule with Nile prevented this album from being released.

The next release was written and recorded in 1999, entitled, Self-Made Monster. This release was in the vein of the industrial metal genre, and was more well-received than the previous release. "Death's Shadow" was the first single to be promoted, and charted at number 1 on mp3.com for two months for the industrial genre from January 2000 to March 2000, with the second single, "Crack Rocks in the Engine Block" charting at number 2 in industrial charts, and the third single, "Flesh", charting in the top 10 in industrial charts on mp3.com, simultaneously.

"Death's Shadow" hit number 1 as well on the CMJ loud music chart in 2000, and on mpulse.com in early 2001 (in their gothic/industrial category), both times with "Death's Shadow". Mpulse.com did a dual promotion with Hot Topic at that time, and "Death's Shadow" was also chosen as one of the first tracks to be streaming on Hot Topic radio online. The next release, Grave Matters, in 2001, saw the track "Suck It" hit number 1 on Mpulse.com in the Gothic/Industrial category as well in March 2001.

Mykill joined the band Sister Kill Cycle shortly thereafter, and did not release as Devolution again until 2007 with United Slaves of Amerika, demonstrating Mykill's research into, and growing concern for, the loss of civil liberties in the US following the tragedy of 9/11. The single "DCOG (District of Columbia Original Gangsters)" from the United Slaves of Amerika release hit number 1 on Myspace.com in the Florida Industrial charts in early 2008.

In 2012, Mykill left Sister Kill Cycle, and decided to rename Devolution to United Slaves of Amerika, releasing four new singles since that time. "Killing Is Sexy" and "How To Speak Amerikan" were released simultaneously in July 2012, pushing the 'new' musical project into the top slot for the rock category in Tampa on reverbnation.com. After the songs, and daily articles and graphics were posted on the project's Facebook page, and the release of the singles "Kill The President" and "Just Defy," the fast-growing presence on Facebook catapulted United Slaves of Amerika to the number 12 spot on the overall rock charts on reverbnation.com in September 2013.
