= Nonsynonymous substitution =

Nucleotide mutation that alters the amino acid sequence

A nonsynonymous substitution is a nucleotide mutation that alters the amino acid sequence of a protein. Nonsynonymous substitutions differ from synonymous substitutions, which do not alter amino acid sequences and are (sometimes) silent mutations. As nonsynonymous substitutions result in a biological change in the organism, they are subject to natural selection.

Nonsynonymous substitutions at a certain locus can be compared to the synonymous substitutions at the same locus to obtain the K_{a}/K_{s} ratio. This ratio is used to measure the evolutionary rate of gene sequences. If a gene has lower levels of nonsynonymous than synonymous nucleotide substitution, then it can be inferred to be functional because a K_{a}/K_{s} ratio < 1 is a hallmark of sequences that are being constrained to code for proteins.

Nonsynonymous substitutions are also referred to as replacement mutations.

== Types ==
There are several common types of nonsynonymous substitutions.

Missense mutations are nonsynonymous substitutions that arise from point mutations, mutations in a single nucleotide that result in the substitution of a different amino acid, resulting in a change to the protein encoded.

Nonsense mutations are nonsynonymous substitutions that arise when a mutation in the DNA sequence causes a protein to terminate prematurely by changing the original amino acid to a stop codon. Another type of mutation that deals with stop codons is known as a nonstop mutation or readthrough mutation, which occurs when a stop codon is exchanged for an amino acid codon, causing the protein to be longer than specified.

== Natural selection and the nearly neutral theory ==
Studies have shown that diversity among nonsynonymous substitutions is significantly lower than among synonymous substitutions. This is due to the fact that nonsynonymous substitutions are subject to much higher selective pressures than synonymous mutations. Motoo Kimura (1968) determined that calculated mutation rates were impossibly high, unless most of the mutations that occurred were either neutral or "nearly neutral". He determined that if this were true, genetic drift would be a more powerful factor in molecular evolution than natural selection. The "nearly neutral" theory proposes that molecular evolution acting on nonsynonymous substitutions is driven by mutation, genetic drift, and very weak natural selection, and that it is extremely sensitive to population size. In order to determine whether natural selection is taking place at a certain loci, the McDonald–Kreitman test can be performed. The test consists of comparing ratios of synonymous and nonsynonymous genes between closely related species to the ratio of synonymous to nonsynonymous polymorphisms within species. If the ratios are the same, then Neutral theory of molecular evolution is true for that loci, and evolution is proceeding primarily through genetic drift. If there are more nonsynonymous substitutions between species than within a species, positive natural selection is occurring on beneficial alleles and natural selection is taking place. Nonsynonymous substitutions have been found to be more common in loci involving pathogen resistance, reproductive loci involving sperm competition or egg-sperm interactions, and genes that have replicated and gained new functions, indicating that positive selection is taking place.

== Research ==
Research on accurately modeling rates of mutation has been conducted for many years. A recent paper by Ziheng Yang and Rasmus Nielsen compared various methods and developed a new modeling method. They found that the new method was preferable for its smaller biases, which make it useful for large scale screening, but that the maximum-likelihood model was preferable in most scenarios because of its simplicity, and its flexibility in comparing multiple sequences while taking into account phylogeny.

Further research by Yang and Nielsen found that nonsynonymous to synonymous substitution ratios varied across loci in differing evolutionary lineages. During their study of nuclear loci of primates, even-toed ungulates, and rodents, they found that the ratio varied significantly at 22 of the 48 loci studied. This result provides strong evidence against a strictly neutral theory of molecular evolution, which states that mutations are mostly neutral or deleterious, and provides support for theories that include advantageous mutations.

== See also ==
- Missense mutation
- Nonsense mutation
