= Devolution (biology) =

Notion that species can revert to primitive forms

Devolution, de-evolution, or backward evolution (not to be confused with dysgenics) is the notion that species can revert to supposedly more primitive forms over time. The concept relates to the idea that evolution is purposeful (teleology) and thus progressive (orthogenesis), for example that feet might be better than hooves, or lungs than gills. However, evolutionary biology makes no such assumptions, and natural selection shapes adaptations with no foreknowledge or foresights of any kind regarding the outcome. It is possible for small changes (such as in the frequency of a single gene) to be reversed by chance or selection, but this is no different from the normal course of evolution and as such de-evolution is not compatible with a proper understanding of evolution due to natural selection.

In the 19th century, when belief in orthogenesis was widespread, zoologists such as Ray Lankester and Anton Dohrn and palaeontologists Alpheus Hyatt and Carl H. Eigenmann advocated the idea of devolution. The concept appears in Kurt Vonnegut's 1985 novel Galápagos, which portrays a society that has evolved backwards to have small brains.

Dollo's law of irreversibility, first stated in 1893 by the palaeontologist Louis Dollo, denies the possibility of devolution. British evolutionary biologist Richard Dawkins explains Dollo's law as being simply a statement about the improbability of evolution's following precisely the same path twice.

== Context ==
Lamarck's theory of evolution involved a complexifying force that progressively drives animal body plans towards higher levels, creating a ladder of phyla, as well as an adaptive force that causes animals with a given body plan to adapt to circumstances. The idea of progress in such theories permits the opposite idea of decay, seen in devolution.

The idea of devolution is based on the presumption of orthogenesis, the view that evolution has a purposeful direction towards increasing complexity. Modern evolutionary theory, beginning with Darwin at least, poses no such presumption; further, the concept of evolutionary change is independent of either any increase in complexity of organisms sharing a gene pool, or any decrease, such as in vestigiality or in loss of genes. Earlier views that species are subject to "cultural decay", "drives to perfection", or "devolution" are practically meaningless in terms of current (neo-)Darwinian theory. Early scientific theories of transmutation of species such as Lamarckism perceived species diversity as a result of a purposeful internal drive or tendency to form improved adaptations to the environment. In contrast, Darwinian evolution and its elaboration in the light of subsequent advances in biological research, have shown that adaptation through natural selection comes about when particular heritable attributes in a population happen to give a better chance of successful reproduction in the reigning environment than rival attributes do. By the same process less advantageous attributes are less "successful"; they decrease in frequency or are lost completely. Since Darwin's time it has been shown how these changes in the frequencies of attributes occur according to the mechanisms of genetics and the laws of inheritance originally investigated by Gregor Mendel. Combined with Darwin's original insights, genetic advances led to what has variously been called the modern evolutionary synthesis or the neo-Darwinism of the 20th century. In these terms evolutionary adaptation may occur most obviously through the natural selection of particular alleles. Such alleles may be long established, or they may be new mutations. Selection also might arise from more complex epigenetic or other chromosomal changes, but the fundamental requirement is that any adaptive effect must be heritable.

The concept of devolution on the other hand, requires that there be a preferred hierarchy of structure and function, and that evolution must mean "progress" to "more advanced" organisms. For example, it could be said that "feet are better than hooves" or "lungs are better than gills", so their development is "evolutionary" whereas change to an inferior or "less advanced" structure would be called "devolution". In reality an evolutionary biologist defines all heritable changes to relative frequencies of the genes or indeed to epigenetic states in the gene pool as evolution. All gene pool changes that lead to increased fitness in terms of appropriate aspects of reproduction are seen as (neo-)Darwinian adaptation because, for the organisms possessing the changed structures, each is a useful adaptation to their circumstances. For example, hooves have advantages for running quickly on plains, which benefits horses, and feet offer advantages in climbing trees, which some ancestors of humans did.

The concept of devolution as regress from progress relates to the ancient ideas that either life came into being through special creation or that humans are the ultimate product or goal of evolution. The latter belief is related to anthropocentrism, the idea that human existence is the point of all universal existence. Such thinking can lead on to the idea that species evolve because they "need to" in order to adapt to environmental changes. Biologists refer to this misconception as teleology, the idea of intrinsic finality that things are "supposed" to be and behave a certain way, and naturally tend to act that way to pursue their own good. From a biological viewpoint, in contrast, if species evolve it is not a reaction to necessity, but rather that the population contains variations with traits that favour their natural selection. This view is supported by the fossil record which demonstrates that roughly ninety-nine percent of all species that ever lived are now extinct.

People thinking in terms of devolution commonly assume that progress is shown by increasing complexity, but biologists studying the evolution of complexity find evidence of many examples of decreasing complexity in the record of evolution. The lower jaw in fish, reptiles and mammals has seen a decrease in complexity, if measured by the number of bones. Ancestors of modern horses had several toes on each foot; modern horses have a single hooved toe. Modern humans may be evolving towards never having wisdom teeth, and already have lost most of the tail found in many other mammals - not to mention other vestigial structures, such as the vermiform appendix or the nictitating membrane. In some cases, the level of organization of living creatures can also “shift” downwards (e.g., the loss of multicellularity in some groups of protists and fungi).

A more rational version of the concept of devolution, a version that does not involve concepts of "primitive" or "advanced" organisms, is based on the observation that if certain genetic changes in a particular combination (sometimes in a particular sequence as well) are precisely reversed, one should get precise reversal of the evolutionary process, yielding an atavism or "throwback", whether more or less complex than the ancestors where the process began. At a trivial level, where just one or a few mutations are involved, selection pressure in one direction can have one effect, which can be reversed by new patterns of selection when conditions change. That could be seen as reversed evolution, though the concept is not of much interest because it does not differ in any functional or effective way from any other adaptation to selection pressures.

== History ==
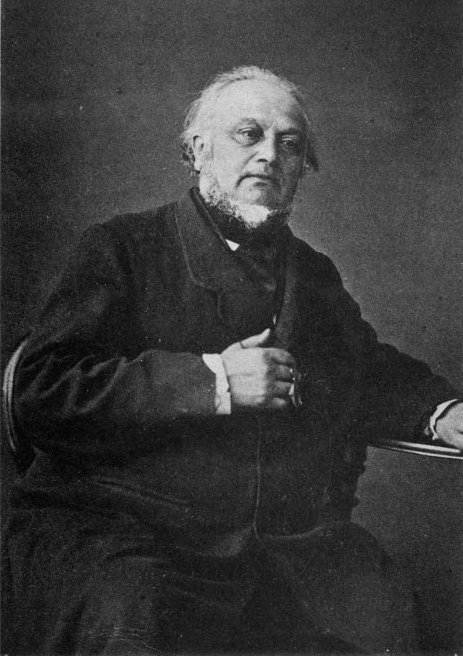
Bénédict Morel (1809–1873) suggested a link between the environment and social degeneration.

The concept of degenerative evolution was used by scientists in the 19th century; at this time it was believed by most biologists that evolution had some kind of direction.

In 1857 the physician Bénédict Morel, influenced by Lamarckism, claimed that environmental factors such as taking drugs or alcohol would produce social degeneration in the offspring of those individuals, and would revert those offspring to a primitive state. Morel, a devout Catholic, had believed that mankind had started in perfection, contrasting modern humanity to the past. Morel claimed there had been "Morbid deviation from an original type". His theory of devolution was later advocated by some biologists.

According to Roger Luckhurst:

Darwin soothed readers that evolution was progressive, and directed towards human perfectibility. The next generation of biologists were less confident or consoling. Using Darwin's theory, and many rival biological accounts of development then in circulation, scientists suspected that it was just as possible to devolve, to slip back down the evolutionary scale to prior states of development.

One of the first biologists to suggest devolution was Ray Lankester, he explored the possibility that evolution by natural selection may in some cases lead to devolution, an example he studied was the regressions in the life cycle of sea squirts. Lankester discussed the idea of devolution in his book Degeneration: A Chapter in Darwinism (1880). He was a critic of progressive evolution, pointing out that higher forms existed in the past which have since degenerated into simpler forms. Lankester argued that "if it was possible to evolve, it was also possible to devolve, and that complex organisms could devolve into simpler forms or animals".

Anton Dohrn also developed a theory of degenerative evolution based on his studies of vertebrates. According to Dohrn many chordates are degenerated because of their environmental conditions. Dohrn claimed cyclostomes such as lampreys are degenerate fish as there is no evidence their jawless state is an ancestral feature but is the product of environmental adaptation due to parasitism. According to Dohrn if cyclostomes would devolve further then they would resemble something like an Amphioxus.

The historian of biology Peter J. Bowler has written that devolution was taken seriously by proponents of orthogenesis and others in the late 19th century who at this period of time firmly believed that there was a direction in evolution. Orthogenesis was the belief that evolution travels in internally directed trends and levels. The paleontologist Alpheus Hyatt discussed devolution in his work, using the concept of racial senility as the mechanism of devolution. Bowler defines racial senility as "an evolutionary retreat back to a state resembling that from which it began."

Hyatt who studied the fossils of invertebrates believed that up to a point ammonoids developed by regular stages up until a specific level but would later due to unfavourable conditions descend back to a previous level, this according to Hyatt was a form of lamarckism as the degeneration was a direct response to external factors. To Hyatt after the level of degeneration the species would then become extinct, according to Hyatt there was a "phase of youth, a phase of maturity, a phase of senility or degeneration foreshadowing the extinction of a type". To Hyatt the devolution was predetermined by internal factors which organisms can neither control or reverse. This idea of all evolutionary branches eventually running out of energy and degenerating into extinction was a pessimistic view of evolution and was unpopular amongst many scientists of the time.

Carl H. Eigenmann an ichthyologist wrote Cave vertebrates of America: a study in degenerative evolution (1909) in which he concluded that cave evolution was essentially degenerative. The entomologist William Morton Wheeler and the Lamarckian Ernest MacBride (1866–1940) also advocated degenerative evolution. According to Macbride invertebrates were actually degenerate vertebrates, his argument was based on the idea that "crawling on the seabed was inherently less stimulating than swimming in open waters."

== Degeneration theory ==
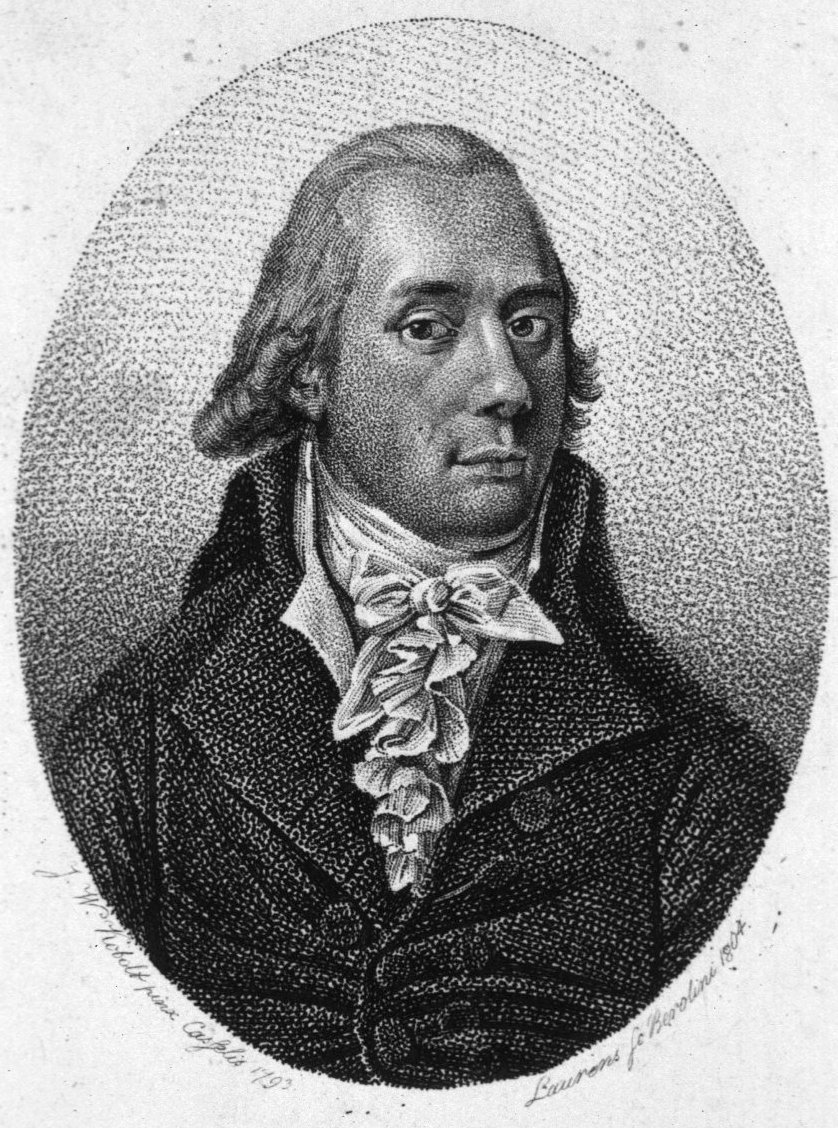
Johan Friedrich Blumenbach 1752 - 1840

Johann Friedrich Blumenbach and other monogenists such as Georges-Louis Leclerc, Comte de Buffon were believers in the "Degeneration theory" of racial origins. The theory claims that races can degenerate into "primitive" forms. Blumenbach claimed that Adam and Eve were white and that other races came about by degeneration from environmental factors such as the sun and poor diet. Buffon believed that the degeneration could be reversed if proper environmental control was taken and that all contemporary forms of man could revert to the original Caucasian race.

Blumenbach claimed Negroid pigmentation arose because of the result of the heat of the tropical sun, cold wind caused the tawny colour of the Eskimos and the Chinese were fair skinned compared to the other Asian stocks because they kept mostly in towns protected from environmental factors.

According to Blumenbach there are five races all belonging to a single species: Caucasian, Mongolian, Ethiopian, American and Malay. Blumenbach however stated:

I have allotted the first place to the Caucasian because this stock displays the most beautiful race of men.

According to Blumenbach the other races are supposed to have degenerated from the Caucasian ideal stock. Blumenbach denied that his "Degeneration theory" was racist; he also wrote three essays claiming non-white peoples are capable of excelling in arts and sciences in reaction against racialists of his time who believed they couldn't.

== In literature and popular culture ==
Jonathan Swift's 1726 novel Gulliver's Travels contains a story about Yahoos, a kind of human-like creature turned into a savage, animal-like the state of society in which the Houyhnhnms—descendants of horses—are the dominant species.

H. G. Wells' 1895 novel, The Time Machine, describes a future world where humanity has degenerated into two distinct branches who have their roots in the class distinctions of Wells' day. Both have sub-human intelligence and other putative dysgenic traits. Pushing further into the future humans become simpler until they become roundish worms flopping in the mud under a dying sun.

Similarly, Helena Blavatsky, founder of Theosophy, believed, contrary to standard evolutionary theory, that apes had devolved from humans rather than the opposite, through affected people "putting themselves on the animal level".

H.P. Lovecraft's 1924 short story The Rats in the Walls also describes devolved humans.

Cyril M. Kornbluth's 1951 short story "The Marching Morons" is an example of dysgenic pressure in fiction, describing a man who accidentally ends up in the distant future and discovers that dysgenics has resulted in mass stupidity. Similarly, Mike Judge's 2006 film Idiocracy has the same premise, with the main character the subject of a military hibernation experiment that goes awry, taking him 500 years into the future. While in "The Marching Morons", civilization is kept afloat by a small group of dedicated geniuses, in Idiocracy, voluntary childlessness among high-IQ couples leaves only automated systems to fill that role.

T. J. Bass's novels Half Past Human and The Godwhale describe humanity becoming cooperative and "low-maintenance" to the detriment of all other traits.

Kurt Vonnegut's 1985 novel Galápagos is set a million years in the future, where humans have "devolved" to have much smaller brains. Robert E. Howard, in The Hyborian Age, an essay on his Conan the Barbarian universe, stated that the Atlanteans devolved into "ape-men", and had once been the Picts (distinct from the actual people; his are closely modeled on Algonquian Native Americans).

In the live action Super Mario Bros. (film), Bowser's (here a humanoid Tyrannosaurus rex portrayed by the late Dennis Hopper instead of a draconic turtle creature like in the games) ultimate goal is to conquer both the Dinosaur World (the movie's version of the Mushroom Kingdom from the games) and the "real" Earth by kidnapping the dinosaur Princess Daisy (whom herself was originally the secondary princess character from the games but otherwise substitutes for the main Princess Peach in the movie), who carries a fragment of the meteorite whose impact split Earth into two different timelines, one being the "real" timeline and the other where dinosaurs survived and evolved into humanoids and developed civilization, and forcibly trick her into merging both timelines back together again using said meteorite fragment (since she's the only one capable of such ability), so he can take over both worlds with his army of "Goombas" (depicted here as hulking, reptilian ogre-like creatures instead of the mushroom enemies seen in the games) created via forcibly devolving innocent dinosaur people, including Toad (originally a friendly humanoid mushroom in the games), first by using a torture device-like devolution machine and later using handheld devolution guns (crafted from real-life Super Scopes), with his plans for world domination involving forcibly devolving all of Earth's humans into non-human primates like chimpanzees (with Anthony Scapelli, the movie's Foreman Spike and Donkey King equivalent, being his first victim of devolution), thus allowing the dinosaurs to reclaim the actual Earth. At the end, Bowser is ultimately defeated when the Mario Bros. gain access to his own devolution guns, who then forcibly use Bowser's own weapons against him, first devolving him back into a regular T. rex and then finally dissolving him into a puddle of primoridial ooze.

The American new wave band Devo derived both their name and overarching philosophy from the concept of "de-evolution" and used social satire and humor to espouse the idea that humanity had actually regressed over time. According to music critic Steve Huey, the band "adapted the theory to fit their view of American society as a rigid, dichotomized instrument of repression ensuring that its members behaved like clones, marching through life with mechanical, assembly-line precision and no tolerance for ambiguity."

The 1998 song "Flagpole Sitta" by Harvey Danger finds lighthearted humor in dysgenics with the lines "Been around the world and found/That only stupid people are breeding/The cretins cloning and feeding/And I don't even own a tv".

DC Comics' Aquaman has one of the seven races of Atlantis called The Trench, similar to the Grindylows of British folklore, Cthulhu Mythos' Deep One, Universal Classic Monsters' Gill-man, and Fallout's Mirelurk. They were regressed to survive in the deepest, darkest places on the bottom of ocean trenches where they hide—hence their name—and are photophobic when in contact with light.

LEGO's 2009 Bionicle sets include Glatorian and Agori. One of the six tribes includes The Sand Tribe, which the Glatorian and Agori of that tribe are turned into scorpion-like beasts—the Vorox and the Zesk—by their creators, The Great Beings; whom are also of the same species as Glatorian and Agori.

== See also ==
- Atavism
- Biological constraints
- Evolutionary trap
- Ecological trap
- Mutational meltdown
