= T. J. Bass =

T. J. Bass may refer to:

- T. J. Bass (author) (1932–2011), American author
- T. J. Bass (American football) (born 1999), American football player
