= Horizontal evolution =

Disambiguation to articles with alternative titles

The phrase horizontal evolution is used in evolutionary biology to refer to:

- Concerted evolution, whereby individual members of a DNA family within one species are more closely related to each other than to members of the same type of DNA family in other species;
- Horizontal gene transfer, where genes are transferred from one organism to another by means other than genes received from an ancestor

It is sometimes used by creationists as a synonym for

- Microevolution, development of genetic changes below the speciation threshold
