= DbDNV =

dbDNV

Content
- Description: duplicated gene nucleotide variants in the human genome.
- Organisms: Homo sapiens

Contact
- Research center: National Yang-Ming University, Taipei 112, Taiwan.
- Laboratory: Institute of Biomedical Informatics
- Authors: Meng-Ru Ho
- Primary citation: Ho & al. (2011)
- Release date: 2010

Access
- Website: http://goods.ibms.sinica.edu.tw/DNVs/

The duplicated gene nucleotide variant database (dbDNV) is a database of duplicated-gene nucleotide variants in the human genome

== See also ==
- Gene duplication
