= Functional divergence =

Process by which genes shift in function

Functional divergence is the process by which genes, after gene duplication, shift in function from an ancestral function. Functional divergence can result in either subfunctionalization, where a paralog specializes one of several ancestral functions, or neofunctionalization, where a totally new functional capability evolves. It is thought that this process of gene duplication and functional divergence is a major originator of molecular novelty and has produced the many large protein families that exist today.

Functional divergence is just one possible outcome of gene duplication events. Other fates include nonfunctionalization where one of the paralogs acquires deleterious mutations and becomes a pseudogene and superfunctionalization (reinforcement), where both paralogs maintain original function. While gene, chromosome, or whole genome duplication events are considered the canonical sources of functional divergence of paralogs, orthologs (genes descended from speciation events) can also undergo functional divergence and horizontal gene transfer can also result in multiple copies of a gene in a genome, providing the opportunity for functional divergence.

Many well known protein families are the result of this process, such as the ancient gene duplication event that led to the divergence of hemoglobin and myoglobin, the more recent duplication events that led to the various subunit expansions (alpha and beta) of vertebrate hemoglobins, or the expansion of G-protein alpha subunits

== See also ==
- Heterotachy
- Subfunctionalization
- Neofunctionalization
