= Gene amplification in Paramecium tetraurelia =

Gene amplification in Paramecium tetraurelia is an example of gene amplification that has occurred in the unicellular organism Paramecium tetraurelia.

Gene duplication occurs in a large number of organisms as part of evolution or as the cause or result of disease (as in the case of the amylase genes in humans, and genes in cancer cells respectively). Gene duplication often leads to amplification of their gene products due to transcription and translation of all gene duplicates. Evidence of gene duplication has been observed the inheritance patterns of Paramecium tetraurelia, a common model organism. In one strain of P. tetraurelia, d4-95, a recessive mutant allele of a gene known as pawn-B found in this strain is inherited through gene duplication and amplification between generations, and even self-fertilizations. The inheritance of this allele is the first description of gene duplication and amplification in the micronucleus of ciliates. Additionally, it appears that the duplication of the mutant allele occurred after mutagenesis due to the similarity in nucleotide sequences of different copies of the mutant allele, especially in the coding region. When the d4-95 strain was crossed with a wild-type P. tetraurelia, F2 and later progeny often expressed the phenotype of the pawn-B mutant, despite carrying a wild-type gene at the pawn-B locus. This phenotype was maintained in progeny even after the self-fertilization of theoretical wild-type homozygotes that had been recovered from the cross.

As is the case of other Paramecium, P. tetraurelia exhibits a number of non-Mendelian modes of inheritance, partially due to the existence of both macro- and micronuclei. In both the macro- and micronucleus of the d4-95 strain of P. tetraurelia contained many more copies of the mutant gene than in the wild type strain. This occurs due to the ability of most of the extra pawn-B gene copies to be heritable independently from the original pawn-B locus. Additionally, there is evidence that in the development of the macronucleus between generations, there is differential gene duplication of copies of pawn-B which causes variable amplification of the allele – between four and twelve times – and heterogeneity between the copies. This duplication leads to amplification of the gene that suppresses the expression of any non-mutant pawn-B loci. Duplication also occurs in the micronucleus, where considerably higher numbers of copies of the pawn-B mutant have been found than the number of copies of the wild-type non-mutant. Additionally, the number of copies can be decreased in progeny by "diluting" the copies of the mutant allele through backcrossing with the wild-type parent, over multiple generations. As the number of copies of the pawn-B mutant decrease, the progeny eventually return to Mendelian inheritance of the wild-type pawn-B alleles.

While the exact structure of the amplified copies of the allele in the micronucleus is not currently known, it appears to be consistent with the original micronuclear locus, as opposed to the locus of the macronucleus, which includes regions not found in the micronuclear locus. Additionally, in some of the backcrosses, extra copies of the gene were still present, even after multiple generations. It is not clear whether this is due to tight linkage of the gene copies to the original locus, or because of continued gene duplication of the remaining copies, but it appears that it is more likely due to continued duplication, as the number of copies of the mutant pawn-B vary between the independent clones; it is also possible that there is an extrachromosomal element that plays a role, which has been observed in other protozoa.
