= Gabriel Dover =

British geneticist

- Born: Gabriel A. Dover; 13 December 1937; Manchester
- Died: 1 April 2018 (aged 80)
- Education: University of Leeds (BSc); University of Cambridge (PhD)
- Known for: Molecular drive
- Scientific career
- Institutions: University of Cambridge; University of Leicester
- Thesis: The genetics and function of the meiotic pairing-control systems in the triticinae (1972)
- Doctoral advisor: Ralph Riley
- Doctoral students: Stephen D. M. Brown; Enrico Coen

Gabriel A. Dover (13 December 1937 – 1 April 2018) was a British geneticist, best known for coining the term molecular drive in 1982 to describe a putative third evolutionary force operating distinctly from natural selection and genetic drift.

== Early life and education ==
Dover was born in Manchester in 1937. Born to a Jewish family, his adolescence included moving to Palestine in 1938–1942, and again for 5 years after the war, when he lived in Israel on a kibbutz. Described as "deeply politicised" and discomforted with the plight of the Palestinians he returned to the UK, and pursued a life in academia. His first degree was in Hebrew and Aramaic (first class) from the University of London in 1960. He was then awarded a Bachelor of Science degree in botany and genetics from the University of Leeds. In 1972 he received a PhD from the University of Cambridge for research on the genetics and function of the meiotic pairing-control systems, supervised by Ralph Riley.

== Research and career ==
Dover's research was on the evolution of genes and genomes, particularly the complex processes that occur in multigene families such as ribosomal RNA genes. His recent work has focused on development in flies, in particular the co-evolution between the developmental regulatory elements involved in morphogenesis.

The majority of his career was spent at the Department of Genetics at the University of Cambridge. In 1992, Dover became a professor of genetics at the University of Leicester. He was awarded a Research Fellowship in 1997 and an emeritus Fellowship in 2002 by the Leverhulme Trust.

Dover co-edited the textbook Genome Evolution with Richard B. Flavell. He also wrote a popular book on evolution, Dear Mr Darwin: Letters on the Evolution of Life and Human Nature, framed as an exchange of letters with Charles Darwin from beyond the grave. The book seeks to refute the selfish gene theory promulgated by Richard Dawkins.

== Personal life ==
Dover retired in 2002 and lived in Oxford. He had three children. He died on 1 April 2018 of a chest infection.
