= The Godwhale =

1974 novel by T. J. Bass

- Cover of first edition (paperback)
- Author: T. J. Bass
- Language: English
- Series: The Hive series
- Genre: Science fiction novel
- Publisher: Ballantine Books
- Publication date: 1974
- Publication place: United States
- Media type: Print (Hardcover & Paperback)
- Pages: 281 pp
- ISBN: 0-345-31095-0
- Preceded by: Half Past Human

The Godwhale is a science fiction novel by American novelist T. J. Bass, first published in 1974. It is the sequel to Half Past Human. The book was nominated for the Nebula Award for Best Novel in 1974. The novel deals with genetic and biological inventions with a strange and mystical twist.

The Godwhale presents a view of a far-future Earth in which almost all non-human life has been exterminated due to rampant overpopulation, and most human beings have been transformed into weak, docile, diminutive creatures via genetic engineering and extensive reliance on automation and artificial intelligence. Bass utilizes extensive biochemical and medical terminology in the narrative, and many scenes are quite clinically graphic.

== Plot introduction ==
The protagonist, Larry Dever, is gravely injured resulting in a radical surgical procedure, a hemicorporectomy, in which tissue below the waist is removed. He is outfitted with a set of intelligent mechanical legs, a "mannequin", and is placed into suspended animation until the damaged tissue can be restored. He wakes at a time when cloning technology can replace his legs, although for a price. Years before he was awakened, a clone, or "bud child", was created and is now a thriving young boy without language. Horrified by the prospect of his child being sacrificed to provide him with a new lower body, Larry opts to return to suspended animation. His child, Dim Dever, is selected by the guiding world computer, called Olga, to carry his ancient genes to a possible new colony on a planet orbiting Procyon.

Larry awakens in a nightmarish future where an enormous human population of 3.5 trillion occupies vast underground shaft cities covering the planet. Science and technology have declined, and all freely breeding species have been exterminated, except for five-toed Neolithic humans, who are classified as garden vermin. The Hive, a computer-supported underground society inhabited by four-toed humans known as Nebishes, hunts down, kills, and recycles anyone who consumes its crops. Meanwhile, the Benthic Beasts, a group of five-toed humans, have established a precarious existence in abandoned underwater recreational domes.

As Larry is trying to adapt to his new life, without most of his own body or his "cyber" torso, accompanied by Big Har, a genetic defect sent for destruction as an infant but managing to escape 'tweenwalls' in the shaft city- something re-awakens an ancient, half-derelict cyborg, the Godwhale of the title. This enormous 'rake' is an ocean-going biota harvester built in part from a genetically modified blue whale. Initially attempting to rejoin human civilization, the Godwhale (named Rorqual Maru or 'Whale Ship' in Japanese), along with its class six companion cyber, Iron Trilobite, eventually teams up with a genetically modified clone of Larry, ARNOLD (Augmented Renal Nucleus of Larry Dever), Larry himself, and an assortment of misfits and refugees from the Hive. Together they set out to try to find out what mysteriously brings the marine biota back to the previously sterile oceans, while a tiny group from the Hive, the outcasts, and their cyber deities survive and thrive in the face of incredible bungling by the 'Class One' computer that manages humanity and the various castes of 'Nebish' humans brought into the fight.

== Reception ==
The Godwhale was a finalist for the Nebula Award for Best Novel in 1974.

Lester del Rey described The Godwhale as "a complex and fascinating novel [and] a fine example of what science fiction is all about." Writing in The New York Times, Theodore Sturgeon simply declared the novel "Good." James Nicoll, conversely, called it "not a good novel", with "characters (who) are thin when they're not implausible", but nonetheless praised it as "a vivid attempt to imagine how a world with trillions of humans might work".

== See also ==
- Dysgenics
- List of underwater science fiction works
