= Half Past Human =

1971 novel by T. J. Bass

- Cover of first edition (paperback)
- Author: T. J. Bass
- Language: English
- Series: The Hive series
- Genre: Science fiction
- Publisher: Ballantine Books
- Publication date: 1971
- Publication place: United States
- Media type: Print (Paperback)
- Pages: 279
- ISBN: 0-345-02306-4
- OCLC: 2437954
- Followed by: The Godwhale

Half Past Human is a fixup science fiction novel by American author T. J. Bass, published in 1971. Two short stories were combined and fleshed out to form this novel: "Half Past Human", first published in Galaxy Science Fiction in December 1969, and "G.I.T.A.R.", first published in If in November and December 1970. The novel belongs to the Hive series, which also includes The Godwhale.

Bass' Hive series of stories are replete with obvious and not-so-obvious references to nomenclature commonly used in pathology, including eponymic puns (note a male character's observation of a female character's attractive "Howell-Jolly body").

Half Past Human was nominated for the Nebula Award for Best Novel in 1971.

== Plot summary ==
Bass' future Earth is an environment in which the sum of the biota serves as its food chain. Human science has created the four-toed Nebish, a pallid, short-lived and highly programmable humanoid who has had the elements that do not facilitate an underground Hive existence (aggression, curiosity, etc.) bred out of it. The five-toed humans (called buckeyes) wander the biofarms that keep the trillions of Earth's Nebish population fed. All vertebrates other than man and rat are extinct, so meat comes from other humans (and the occasional rat). The conflict between the Hives and the roving bands of five-toed original Humans, who are reduced to savagery and hunted like vermin by Hive Hunter Control, forms the backdrop of this novel.

The story begins as Old Man Moon and his dog Dan wander the fields. They are genetic experiments with their biological clocks stopped. They encounter Toothpick, a companion cyber from the days when technology was more advanced before the hive decline. Toothpick urges Moon to pick him up, but Moon does not like cybers—they work for the Hive. Toothpick promises food and when he makes good on his promise that an electrical storm will short circuit the agromecks from reporting his pilfering of the gardens, Moon considers Toothpick's offer of companionship. Toothpick explains he is a companion cyber, and when he promises new teeth for Moon and Dan, Moon agrees and the three set off on Toothpick's unstated mission.

Something strange is happening, as the primitive buckeyes are showing signs of a purpose whose goal is unclear and probably dangerous to the balance of the Hive. There seems to be a third party stirring the pot, campaigning in a relentlessly successful battle with the computer minds that keep this "brave new world" in balance. Agendas beyond the ken of their protagonists begin to come into play, and an epic battle between the Four- and the Five-toed is looming.

== See also ==
- Dysgenics
