= Concerted evolution =

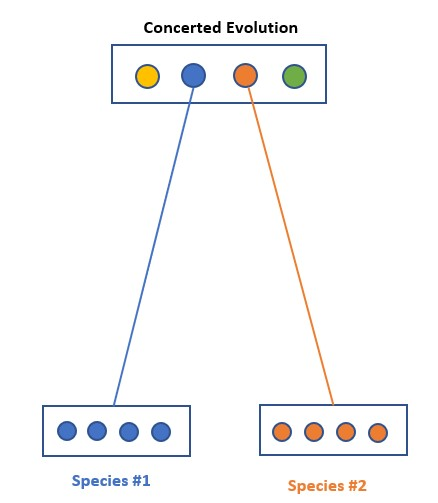

Concerted evolution is the phenomenon where paralogous genes within one species are more closely related to one another than to members of the same gene family in closely related species. In other terms, when specific members of a family are investigated, a greater amount of similarity is found within a species rather than between species. This is suggesting that members within this family do not in fact evolve independently of one another.

The concept of concerted evolution is a molecular process which leads to the homogenization of DNA sequences.

As shown from the diagram on the right, as each organism evolves, it creates a species that is more closely related to their genes than anyone else in their species. This is demonstrated by the different colors of circles. If each different color is representing a different organism in one species, this is showing that once the blue and the orange reproduce, they create organisms that are incredibly alike to them (thus they are represented as the same color)

This fundamental process operates in all organisms, even if it does not seem ultimately present at every moment.

== Causes ==
Concerted evolution (phenomenon of duplicated genes) may often be caused by the genetic exchange known as gene conversion. This other phenomenon is known as the "non-reciprocal exchange of genetic material between homologous sequences."

Gene conservation can do a few things...

- Decrease mutational load
- Eliminate deleterious mutations
- Spread advantageous alleles

...thus playing a role in concerted evolution.

Gene conversion is also reliant on the gene sequences that are involved in the current process. Some entire gene sequences have undergone the process of concerted evolution whereas others have a more mosaic pattern where some genes are homogenized, and others diverge without this conversion.

== Example ==
An example can be seen in bacteria: Escherichia coli (can cause severe food poisoning in hosts) has seven operons encoding various ribosomal RNA genes. For each of these genes, rDNA sequences are essentially identical among all of the seven operons (sequence divergence of only 0.195%). In a closely related species, Haemophilus influenzae its six ribosomal RNA operons are entirely identical. When the 2 species are compared together however, the sequence divergence of the 16S rRNA gene between them is 5.90%.

== Factors affecting the rate of concerted evolution ==
1. The specific number of repeats counted
2. The arrangement of those repeats aforementioned (dispersed vs. clustered)
3. Relative sizes of slowly and rapidly evolving regions (within that repeating unit)
  1. Noncoding regions evolve very rapidly
  2. Coding regions evolve very slowly
4. Restriction on homogeneity
5. Population size
6. Requirement of doses

== Requirements ==
- The horizontal transfer of mutations among the family members (homogenization)
- The spread of mutations in the population (fixation)

== Hypotheses to explain concerted evolution ==
1. High sequence similarity between paralogs may be maintained by homologous recombination events that lead to gene conversion, effectively copying some sequence from one and overwriting the homologous region in the other. Another possible hypothesis that has yet to be disproved is that rapid waves of gene duplication are responsible for the apparently "concerted" homogeneity of tandem and unlinked repeats seen in concerted evolution.
2. Rapid amplification of a gene, usually assisted by recombination events in IS elements, in bacteria, or in other repetitive genetic elements (ERV, LINE, SINE, etc.), for example, in eukaryotes. Unchecked transposition events of these transposable elements are thought to be associated with increases in the copy number of the gene.
3. In sexually reproducing organisms unequal crossing over during meiosis may be responsible for amplification due to misalignment of repeated sequences.
4. Redistribution of genes requires transposition, probably assisted by the same repetitive genetic elements as in 1).
5. Homogenization of alleles by gene conversion may also play a role in sexually reproducing organisms. Some genes may be more prone to gene conversion than others, thus reinforcing the unity of the genes within a gene family of a species.

== Evolution and speciation ==
Findings of concerted evolution, particularly in ribosomal DNA genes, led the Cambridge molecular geneticist Gabriel Dover to his controversial proposal of molecular drive, which in his view was an evolutionary principle distinct both from natural selection and from genetic drift. Closely related species or even populations may differ in their nucleolus organizing regions (NORs), which are genomic regions that contain many copies of ribosomal RNA genes in eukaryotes, typically found within or adjacent to highly repetitive parts of the genome such as centromeres or telomeres in mammals such as the house mouse Mus musculus or insects such as the grasshopper Podisma pedestris.

== Further research ==
The link between concerted evolution or molecular drive both playing a role in speciation is currently unknown. While this is not currently correlated, it seems entirely possible that for example some hybrids or backcrosses between species with different nucleolar organizing regions/ribosomal DNA repeat regions may have reduced fitness as a result of over- or under-expression of ribosomal RNA.
