= T. J. Bass (author) =

American novelist (1932–2011)

- Born: Thomas J. Bassler; July 7, 1932; Clinton, Iowa, United States
- Died: December 13, 2011 (aged 79)
- Occupations: Physician, science fiction writer

Thomas J. Bassler (July 7, 1932 – December 13, 2011) was an American science fiction author (under the pseudonym T. J. Bass) and physician.

Bassler graduated with a medical degree from the University of Iowa in 1959, afterwards serving a tour of duty as an Army pathologist and starting a family. He published his first short story in the September 1968 issue of Worlds of If, as "Thomas J. Bassler M.D."; an accompanying biographical note described him as "a California doctor whose hobbies are marathon running, skin diving, tournament chess [and] considering the medical probabilities involved in man's conquest of space." His SF career was relatively abbreviated, spanning only six years.

Bass' literary output consisted almost entirely of his wildly-dystopian "Hive" series, set on a future Earth dominated by a vast underground civilization of degenerate four-toed humans known as 'nebishes', who have stripped the planet of nearly all non-human biomass to support a population of three trillion. His only two novels - Half Past Human (1971) and The Godwhale (1974) - both took place in this setting, and were both nominated for the Nebula Award.

Bass was noted for his vivid, highly-modernistic literary style; his prose featured an almost-anatomical level of attention to physiological detail, closely informed by his medical background and sometimes verging on body horror. All of his works had distinctively biological themes, with a particular focus on human enhancement via eugenics, bio-hacking, and cybernetics, in some ways anticipating the cyberpunk era. Bass tended to reuse certain thematic elements, even in stories that did not share continuity: visceral, slow-motion depictions of one-on-one combat, the raising of clones for organ harvesting, benign artificial intelligence with mobile or human-worn peripherals, the evolutionary benefits of genetic diversity, and "Implant" starships designed to establish an Earth biosphere on extrasolar colony worlds.

In addition to Bass' fiction output, he published (under his legal name) a 1979 mass-market diet-and-lifestyle book, The Whole Life Diet. It included the assertion that a fit individual - which Bassler defined as a nonsmoker in sufficiently good condition to complete a marathon in under four hours - was at zero risk of a heart attack, no matter what his diet. The claim attracted controversy after activist John Robbins noted that fitness advocate Jim Fixx had approvingly quoted Bassler in his own best-selling book, The Complete Book of Running, written before his death from heart failure at 52 while running.

== Bibliography ==
Novels (as T. J. Bass)

- Half Past Human (1971, fix-up)
- The Godwhale (1974)

Short stories

- "Star Itch" - If (Sep 1968, Hive series)
- "Star Seeder" - If (1969)
- "Half Past Human" - Galaxy Science Fiction (Dec 1969, Hive series)
- "A Game of Biochess" - If (Feb 1970, Hive series)
- "G.I.T.A.R" (or "Song of Kaia") - If (Nov–Dec 1970, Hive series)
- "The Beast of 309" - If (Jan 1972)
- "Rorqual Maru" - Galaxy Science Fiction (Jan-Feb 1972, Hive series)

Nonfiction (as Thomas J. Bassler)

- The Whole Life Diet: An Integrated Program of Nutrition and Exercise for a Lifestyle of Total Health (1979), with Robert E. Burger
