= Subfunctionalization =

Evolution of different specialized function in two copies of a duplicated gene

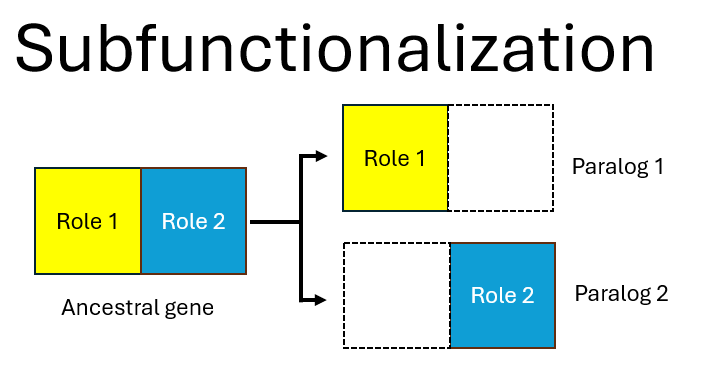
Subfunctionalization is a neutral mutation process in which each paralog retains a subset of its original ancestral function. The figure illustrates that the ancestral gene (yellow & blue) is capable of both functions before gene duplication. After gene duplication the functional capabilities are divided amongst the gene copies. After this divergence each paralog is capable of independently performing a distinct ancestral function.

Subfunctionalization was proposed by Stoltzfus (1999) and Force et al. (1999) as one of the possible outcomes of functional divergence that occurs after a gene duplication event, in which pairs of genes that originate from duplication, or paralogs, take on separate functions. Subfunctionalization is a neutral mutation process of constructive neutral evolution; meaning that no new adaptations are formed. During the process of gene duplication paralogs simply undergo a division of labor by retaining different parts (subfunctions) of their original ancestral function. This partitioning event occurs because of segmental gene silencing leading to the formation of paralogs that are no longer duplicates, because each gene only retains a single function. The ancestral gene was capable of performing both functions and the descendant duplicate genes can now only perform one of the original ancestral functions.

== Alternative hypothesis ==
Subfunctionalization after gene duplication is thought to be the newer model of functional divergence. Before 1910, scientists were unaware that genes were capable of multifunctionalization. The original thought was that each gene possessed one function, but in fact genes have independently mutable regions and possessed the ability to subfunctionalize. Neofunctionalization, where one paralogous copy derives a new function after gene duplication, is thought to be the classical model of functional divergence. Nevertheless, because of its neutral mutation process subfunctionalization seem to present a more parsimonious explanation for the retention of duplicates in a genome.

== Specialization ==
Specialization is a unique model of subfunctionalization, in which paralogs divide into various areas of specialty rather than function. In this model both gene copies perform exactly the same ancestral function. For instance, while the ancestral gene may have performed its function in all tissues, developmental stage, and environmental conditions, the paralogous genes become specialists, dividing themselves among different tissues, developmental stages, and environmental conditions. For example, if the ancestral gene is responsible for both digestive and lymphatic regulatory processes, after gene duplication one of the paralogs would claim responsibility for lymphatic regulation and the other for digestive regulation. Specialization is also unique in the fact that it is a positive rather than neutral mutation process. When a gene specializes among different tissues, developmental stages, or environmental conditions it acquires an improvement in function. Isozymes are a good example of this because they are gene products of paralogs that catalyze the same biochemical reaction. However, different members have evolved particular adaptations to different tissues or different developmental stages that enhance the physiological fine-tuning of the cell.

== Gene sharing ==
Gene sharing occurs when a gene acquires a secondary function during its evolutionary process. Gene sharing is unique because the gene maintains and performs both its ancestral function and its acquired function. Gene duplication is not necessary in this model, as the addition of functionality occurs before, or often instead of gene duplication. Gene sharing is a fairly common occurrence and is most often seen in enzymes taking on a various subfunctions such as signal transduction and transcriptional regulation. The most noteworthy example of gene sharing is crystallins, the proteins responsible for transparency and diffraction in the eye lens, which have also been found to serve as a metabolic enzyme in other tissue.

== Escape from adaptive conflict ==
Adaptive conflict arises in gene sharing when an improvement to one gene function severely impairs another function. This occurs because selective constraints are particularly stringent in the case of gene sharing. It is very difficult for either function to undergo morphological changes, due to the fact that both the ancestral and novel functions are needed. As a result of its dual function the gene is subjected to two or more independent sets of evolutionary pressure. This means that positively selecting for improvements in one function is likely to cause deleterious effect in the other function. There are two solutions to the predicament of adaptive conflict. The gene can either completely lose its new function or undergo gene duplication followed by subfunctionalization, also called "function splitting".

== Duplication-Degeneration-Complementation ==
In the Duplication- Degeneration- Complementation (DDC) model of subfunctionalization both gene copies are needed to perform the original ancestral function. In this model after a duplication event, both paralogs suffer deleterious mutations leading to functional degradation. This degradation is so severe that neither gene copy can perform the ancestral function or any subset of that function independently. In order to be functional, the paralogs must work together to perform the ancestral task. This teamwork among paralogs is possible because the subfunction lost in one gene copy is complemented in the other gene copy. This functional sharing would not be possible if both paralogs had lost identical subfunctions. The degeneration and complementation processes make the DDC model a selectively neutral mutation process. The mutations accumulated in both paralogs would have been deleterious if they had not been complemented by the other copy. One example of the DDC model is when functionally similar paralogs are expressed at such low levels that both copies are required to produce sufficient amounts of the original gene product.

== Segregation avoidance ==
Segregation avoidance occurs when an unequal crossing over event leads to a locus duplication containing two heterogeneous alleles creating a situation akin to permanent heterozygosity. This occurs primarily in situations of overdominant selection where the heterozygote has increased fitness but less fit homozygotes are still retained in the population. Segregation avoidance addresses the issue of segregational load, wherein the mean fitness of the population is less than the highest possible fitness. The unequal crossing over and subsequent duplication of a locus containing heterogeneous alleles ensures the highest possible fitness. By avoiding homogeneous alleles organisms in the population can benefit from the advantages that both alleles have to offer. A prime example is the ace-1 locus in house mosquitoes, Culex pipiens. Because of segregation avoidance house mosquitos are able to benefit from ace-1R pesticide resistant allele during pesticide exposure and ace-1S wild-type allele during non-exposure. This duality is particularly useful, as the mutant allele causes decreased fitness during period's non-exposure.

== Hemoglobin ==
Human hemoglobin provides a variety of subfunctionalization examples. For instance, the gene for hemoglobin α-chain is undoubtedly derived from a duplicate copy of hemoglobin β-chain. However, neither chain can function independently to form a monomeric hemoglobin molecule, that is a molecule consisting entirely of α-chains or entirely of β-chains. Conversely, hemoglobin consists of both α and β chains, with α2-β2 being among the most efficient forms of hemoglobin in the human genome. This is a prime example of subfunctionalization. Another good example is the emergence of fetal hemoglobin from embryonic hemoglobin after duplication of the hemoglobin γ- chain. This example of subfunctionalization illustrates how different forms of hemoglobin are present at various developmental stages. In fact, there is distinct hemoglobin at each developmental stage: ζ2-ε2 and α2-ε2 in the embryo, α2-γ2 in the fetus, and α2-β2 and α2-δ2 in adults. Each type of hemoglobin has advantages that are particular to the developmental stage in which it thrives. For example, embryonic and fetal hemoglobin have higher oxygen affinity than adult hemoglobin giving them improved functionality in hypoxic environments such as the uterus.

== See also ==
- Constructive neutral evolution
- Neofunctionalization
