= Neofunctionalization =

Genetic process

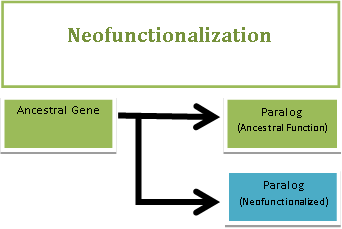
Neofunctionalization is the process by which a gene acquires a new function after a gene duplication event. The figure shows that once a gene duplication event has occurred one gene copy retains the original ancestral function (represented by the green paralog), while the other acquires mutations that allow it to diverge and develop a new function (represented by the blue paralog).

Neofunctionalization, one of the possible outcomes of functional divergence, occurs when one gene copy, or paralog, takes on a totally new function after a gene duplication event. Neofunctionalization is an adaptive mutation process; meaning one of the gene copies must mutate to develop a function that was not present in the ancestral gene. In other words, one of the duplicates retains its original function, while the other accumulates molecular changes such that, in time, it can perform a different task.

== The process ==
The process of neofunctionalization begins with a gene duplication event, which is thought to occur as a defense mechanism against the accumulation of deleterious mutations. Following the gene duplication event there are two identical copies of the ancestral gene performing exactly the same function. This redundancy allows one of the copies to take on a new function. In the event that the new function is advantageous, natural selection positively selects for it and the new mutation becomes fixed in the population. The occurrence of neofunctionalization can most often be attributed to changes in the coding region or changes in the regulatory elements of a gene. It is much more rare to see major changes in protein function, such as subunit structure or substrate and ligand affinity, as a result of neofunctionalization.

== Selective constraints ==
Neofunctionalization is also commonly referred to as "mutation during non-functionality" or "mutation during redundancy". Regardless of if the mutation arises after non-functionality of a gene or due to redundant gene copies, the important aspect is that in both scenarios one copy of the duplicated gene is freed from selective constraints and by chance acquires a new function which is then improved by natural selection. This process is thought to occur very rarely in evolution for two major reasons. The first reason is that functional changes typically require a large number of amino acid changes; which has a low probability of occurrence. Secondly, because deleterious mutations occur much more frequently than advantageous mutations in evolution, the likelihood that gene function is lost over time (i.e. pseudogenization) is far greater than the likelihood of the emergence of a new gene function. Walsh discovered that the relative probability of neofunctionalization is determined by the selective advantage and the relative rate of advantageous mutations. This was proven in his derivation of the relative probability of neofunctionalization to pseudogenization, which is given by: $\frac{\rho\,\!S-1}{1 - e^s}$ where ρ is the ratio of advantageous mutation rate to null mutation rate and S is the population selection 4NeS (Ne: effective population size S: selection intensity).

== Classical model ==
In 1936, Muller originally proposed neofunctionalization as a possible outcome of a gene duplication event. In 1970, Ohno suggested that neofunctionalization was the only evolutionary mechanism that gave rise to new gene functions in a population. He also believed that neofunctionalization was the only alternative to pseudogenization. Ohta (1987) was among the first to suggest that other mechanisms may exist for the preservation of duplicated genes in the population. Today, subfunctionalization is a widely accepted alternative fixation process for gene duplicates in the population and is currently the only other possible outcome of functional divergence.

== Neosubfunctionalization ==
Neosubfunctionalization occurs when neofunctionalization is the result of subfunctionalization. In other words, once a gene duplication event occurs forming paralogs that after an evolutionary period subfunctionalize, one gene copy continues on this evolutionary journey and accumulates mutations that give rise to a new function. Some believe that neofunctionalization is the end stage for all subfunctionalized genes. For instance, according to Rastogi and Liberles "Neofunctionalization is the terminal fate of all duplicate gene copies retained in the genome and subfunctionlization merely exist as a transient state to preserve the duplicate gene copy." The results of their study become punctuated as population size increases.

== Examples ==
The evolution of the antifreeze protein in the Antarctic zoarcid fish Lycodichthys dearborni provides a prime example of neofunctionalization after gene duplication. In the case of the Antarctic zoarcid fish type III antifreeze protein gene (AFPIII; P12102) diverged from a paralogous copy of sialic acid synthase (SAS) gene. The ancestral SAS gene was found to have both sialic acid synthase and rudimentary ice-binding functionalities. After duplication one of the paralogs began to accumulate mutations that lead to the replacement of SAS domains of the gene allowing for further development and optimization of the antifreeze functionality. The new gene is now capable of noncolligative freezing-point depression, and thus is neofunctionalized. This specialization allows Antarctic zoarcid fish to survive in the frigid temperatures of the Antarctic Seas.

Another example concerns the light-sensitive opsin proteins in vertebrate eyes that allow them to see different wavelengths of light. Extant vertebrates typically have four cone opsin classes (LWS, SWS1, SWS2, and Rh2) as well as one rod opsin class (rhodopsin, Rh1), all of which were inherited from early vertebrate ancestors. These five classes of vertebrate visual opsins emerged through a series of gene duplications beginning with LWS and ending with Rh1.

== Model limitations ==
Limitations exist in neofunctionalization as a model for functional divergence primarily because:

1. the amount of nucleotide changes giving rise to a new function must be very minimal; making the probability for pseudogenization much higher than neofunctionalization after a gene duplication event.
2. After a gene duplication event both copies may be subjected to selective pressure equivalent to that constraining the ancestral gene; meaning that neither copy is available for neofunctionalization.
3. In many cases positive Darwinian selection presents a more parsimonious explanation for the divergence of multigene families.

== See also ==
- Atavism
- Exaptation
- Subfunctionalization
