= Mir-6 microRNA precursor =

MicroRNA family

mir-6 microRNA precursor
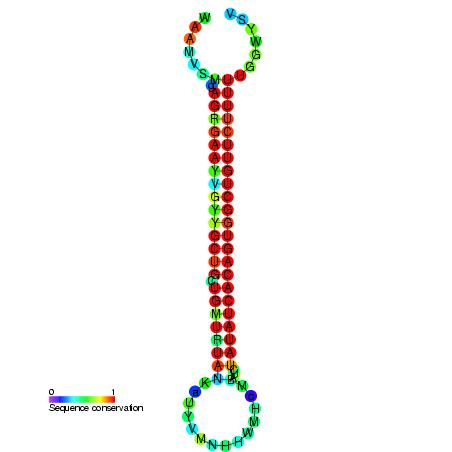
- Predicted secondary structure and sequence conservation of mir-6

Identifiers
- Symbol: mir-6
- Rfam: RF00143
- miRBase: MI0000124
- miRBase family: MIPF0000119

Other data
- RNA type: Gene; miRNA
- Domain: Eukaryota
- GO: GO:0035195 GO:0035068
- SO: SO:0001244
- PDB structures: PDBe

The mir-6 microRNA precursor is a precursor microRNA specific to Drosophila species. In Drosophila melanogaster there are three mir-6 paralogs called dme-mir-6-1, dme-mir-6-2, dme-mir-6-3, which are clustered together in the genome. The extents of these hairpin precursors are estimated based on hairpin prediction. Each precursor is generated following the cleavage of a longer primary transcript in the nucleus, and is exported in the cytoplasm. In the cytoplasm, precursors are further processed by the enzyme Dicer, generating ~22 nucleotide products from each arm of the hairpin. The products generated from the 3' arm of each mir-6 precursor have identical sequences. Both 5' and 3' mature products are experimentally validated. Experimental data suggests that the mature products of mir-6 hairpins are expressed in the early embryo of Drosophila and target apoptotic genes such as hid, grim and rpr.

== Links to further miRNAs ==
Near perfect complementarity has been observed between miR-5 and miR-6 at 20/21 nucleotides. However, miR-5 is only related on a minor level to any of the three respective miR-6 sequences. miR-6 genes reside in a gene cluster containing other non-K-box family miRNAs, including miRNAs-3 and-309, and the Brd box family gene mir-4. Alignment has shown miR-6 to share the same family motif as miR-11 and miR-2b, together making up the mir-2 clan. There is, however, little similarity in the 3' ends between these clan members.

== Apoptotic regulation ==
mir-6 plays a key role in the regulation of early apoptosis. Indeed, there is a much increased apoptotic rate in miR-6-depleted embryos compared with control embryos, indicating that mir-6 acts to suppress apoptosis. The pro-apoptotic factor Hid is controlled solely by miR-6, which sees its regulation at a post-transcriptional level. miR-6-depleted embryos have been found to show the strongest phenotype of all miR-2 family members, explained by their interaction with hid, the pro-apoptotic gene with the broadest expression and strongest proapoptotic effect. Embryos injected with mir-6 antisense failed to differentiate normal internal and external structures, with the number of apoptotic cells much increased compared to wildtype cells. Further work into this with miR-6-depleted blastoderm embryos found pole cell formation at the posterior end of the anteroposterior axis to be disrupted, despite normality of both cellularisation and early pattern formation.
