= Barbara R. Holland =

Australian mathematician (born 1976)

Barbara Ruth Holland
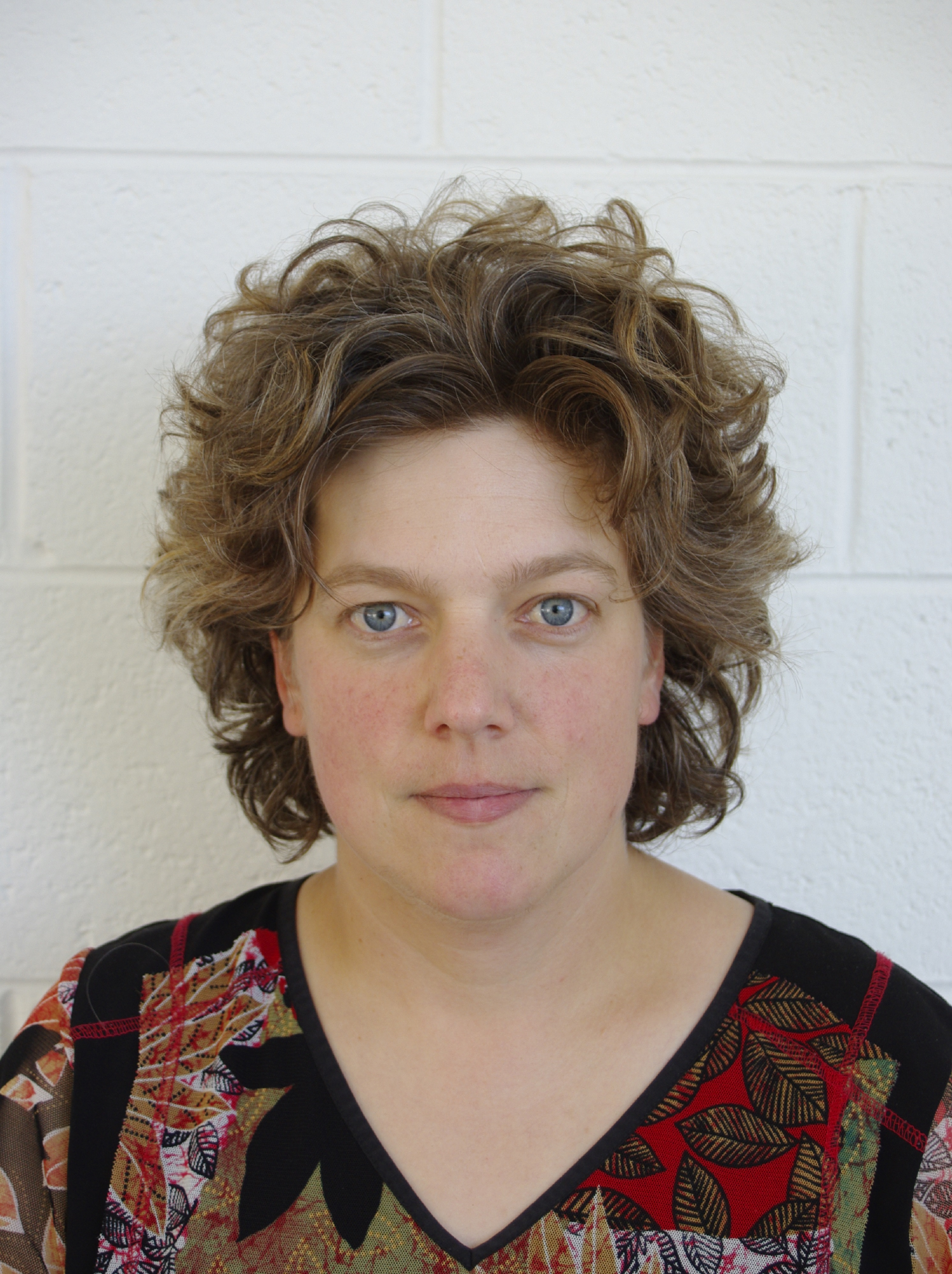
- Born: 23 January 1976 (age 50)
- Education: Massey University
- Known for: Theoretical Phylogenetics
- Awards: Australian Research Council Future Fellow (2011-2014)
- Scientific career
- Fields: Theoretical Phylogenetics
- Workplaces: University of Tasmania
- Thesis: Evolutionary analyses of large data sets: Trees and beyond (2001)
- Doctoral advisor: Michael Hendy; David Penny

Barbara Ruth Holland is a New Zealand-born Australian scientist. She is a professor of mathematics and member of the Theoretical Phylogenetics Group at the School of Mathematics & Physics at the University of Tasmania. Holland is also a chief investigator at the ARC Centre of Excellence for Plant Success in Nature and Agriculture. She has made substantial contributions to the methods for reconstructing phylogenetic trees from DNA and protein sequence data. Holland has published over 50 journal articles, presented over 30 invited or keynote lectures, refereed five conference proceedings, 2 book chapters and 1 book review. She is a senior editor of the scientific journal Molecular Biology and Evolution.

== Research ==
Holland has research interests in phylogenetics, mathematical biology, population genetics, and epidemiology. Her primary area of interest is in the estimation of evolutionary trees, and she works to develop tools that can assess how well a given model describes a sequence of data. Holland uses her knowledge to help biologists translate the unsolved problems of their field into mathematical language.

== Career ==
Holland completed a doctorate at Massey University in New Zealand in 2001, on evolutionary analyses of large datasets. Holland is currently a professor of mathematics at the University of Tasmania in Australia, where she teaches statistics, operations research, and phylogenetics and is a member of the university's Theoretical Phylogenetics Group.

Holland spent about a year beginning in 2001 as a Post Doctoral Researcher at Ruhr University Bochum in Germany. From 2002 to 2010 Holland was working in a number of different capacities at Massey University in New Zealand. For the duration of her stay she was a part of the Allan Wilson Centre as a Post Doctoral Fellow (2002-2005) and then as a Research Fellow (2005-2010). Holland spent a year as a lecturer in mathematics for the university beginning in 2007 and was a senior lecturer from 2008 to 2010, also in mathematics. In 2010 Holland began lecturing in mathematics at the University of Tasmania in Australia. From 2011 to 2014 she was Future Fellow at the university, a fellowship awarded to her by the Australian Research Council.

== Scientific meeting organizer ==
From 2010 to 2014, Holland served as a co-organizer of Phylomania, a conference which sought to bring together phylogenetic researchers interested in theory to address some of the primary challenges in the field and further develop the branch of mathematics focused on computational phylogenetic methods. In 2010, she was also chief organizer of the New Zealand Phylogenetics Meeting in Whakapapa Village, February 9–14.

== Professional recognition ==
Holland's expertise has allowed her serve as associate, principal, and co-investigator on a variety of research projects and has earned her a number of professional awards and recognitions. In 2004 she was an Associate Investigator on the Marsden-funded project 'Understanding Prokaryotes and Eukaryotes'. The next year she was the Principal Investigator on another Marsden-funded project, 'Genome-scale plant phylogeny and the challenge of lineage-specific sequence evolution'. Also in 2005, she received the Bridge to Employment Grant from the Foundation for Research, Science and Technology (FoRST) and the Hamilton Award from the Royal Society of New Zealand, and was invited to attend the SMBE Tri-national Young Investigators Workshop. In 2006 Holland was a Co-Investigator on yet another Marsden-funded project, 'Candida albicans: Survival without sex?', and received the Early Career Research Medal from Massey University. Holland has served as an editor for the journal Molecular Biology and Evolution, serving as associate editor in 2007 and appointed senior editor in 2012. In 2008, was an associate investigator at the Allan Wilson Centre and received the Early Career Research Award from the New Zealand Mathematical Society. In 2009 she was the principal investigator on the Marsden project 'Untangling complex evolution: When the tree of life is not a tree at all'. In 2010 Holland received another Future Fellowship from the Australian Research Council. In 2011 Holland was the co-investigator on two different projects. One was titled 'Ancient Ibis Mummies from Egypt: DNA Evolution' and funded by a Human Frontier Science Program grant. The other was funded by the Australian Research Council Linkage grant and titled 'How will animals respond to climate change? A genomic approach'. Recently, Holland was elected to and served on the council of the Society of Systematic Biologists from 2013 to 2016.
