= SMBE =

The acronym SMBE may refer to:

- Sid Meier's Civilization: Beyond Earth. a video game
- Society for Molecular Biology and Evolution. an academic society
