= Mary O'Connell =

Mary O'Connell may refer to:

- Mary O'Connell (nurse) (1814–1897), Irish-born American Roman Catholic religious sister and nurse during the American Civil War
- Mary O'Connell (1778–1836), Irish wife of Daniel O'Connell
- Mary J. O'Connell, Irish evolutionary genomicist
- Mary Ellen O'Connell, American professor of law
