= Brandon Gaut =

American evolutionary biologist and geneticist

Brandon S. Gaut
- Education: University of California, Berkeley; University of California, Riverside
- Partner: Rebecca Gaut
- Awards: Sloan Foundation Young Investigator Fellowship (1995-1997); AAAS Fellow (2008); Genetics Society of America Mentorship Award (2025)
- Scientific career
- Fields: Molecular evolution; Comparative Genomics
- Workplaces: University of California, Irvine
- Doctoral advisor: Michael T. Clegg
- Notable students: Aoife McLysaght; Adam Eyre-Walker

Brandon Stuart Gaut is an American evolutionary biologist and geneticist who works as a Distinguished Professor of Ecology and Evolutionary Biology at the University of California, Irvine.

Gaut's research focuses on the evolution of genetic variation in populations and its impact on adaptation, speciation, and the maintenance of biodiversity, as well as the evolution of transposable elements and their role in shaping genetic architecture and epigenetic state in plants.

== Education ==
Gaut earned his undergraduate degree from UC Berkeley in 1985 and his Ph.D. in Genetics from UC Riverside from 1988–1992, under the mentorship of Michael T. Clegg. He was a postdoc at NC State University in the Department of Statistics under Bruce Weir until 1995 before becoming an assistant professor at Rutgers University in 1995. He moved to UC Irvine in 1998 and was named a Distinguished professor in 2020.

== Career ==
Gaut served as the president-elect, president and past-president for the Society for Molecular Biology and Evolution from 2013 to 2015. He is Editor-in-Chief for Molecular Biology and Evolution. He served administrative roles as Chair of the Department of Ecology and Evolutionary Biology from 2006–2013 and the Associate Dean for Research in the School of Biological Sciences from 2017–2022.

Gaut was named the Professor of the Year in 2008 at UC Irvine and voted an Outstanding Professor by the senior class. In 2025, he was awarded the inaugural Genetics Society of America Mentorship Award.

== Research ==
Gaut's early work provided several fundamental ideas about the genetic effects of domestication on crop plants; with postdoctoral scholar Adam Eyre-Walker, he used coalescent theory-based models to establish the occurrence of genetic bottlenecks during the domestication of maize, a phenomenon which is now thought to influence the diversity and genome content of many agriculturally important species. He later adopted these models to initiate the search for genes that have been selected through the domestication process, estimating that around 1,200 maize genes (~3% of loci) were involved in its domestication. This work established basic approaches that have been adopted across numerous domesticated species.

Together with John Doebley, Gaut provided the first DNA sequence-based estimates for the time of polyploidization event in a plant, and he has contributed to basic methods used in evolutionary studies, such as the codon model of evolution. Later he characterized important epigenetic phenomena, showing that DNA methylation of transposable elements affects gene expression on a genome-wide scale and is a component of selective load.

Gaut's more recent research has focused on genome evolution in grapes, estimating the demographic history of grape domestication and showing that cultivated grapes possess an abundance of deleterious mutations in a heterozygous state compared to their wild progenitor species, likely due to their history of clonal propagation. His lab also identified loci which may confer resistance to the agriculturally destructive bacterium Xylella fastidiosa.

== Selected publications ==
- Muse, S. V.; Gaut, B. S. (September 1994). "A likelihood approach for comparing synonymous and nonsynonymous nucleotide substitution rates, with application to the chloroplast genome". Molecular Biology and Evolution. 11 (5): 715–724. doi:10.1093/oxfordjournals.molbev.a040152. ISSN 1537-1719. PMID 7968485.
- Doebley, John F.; Gaut, Brandon S.; Smith, Bruce D. (December 2006). "The Molecular Genetics of Crop Domestication". Cell. 127 (7): 1309–1321. doi:10.1016/j.cell.2006.12.006. ISSN 0092-8674. PMID 17190597. S2CID 278993.
- Gaut, Brandon S.; Doebley, John F. (1997-06-24). "DNA sequence evidence for the segmental allotetraploid origin of maize". Proceedings of the National Academy of Sciences. 94 (13): 6809–6814. Bibcode:1997PNAS...94.6809G. doi:10.1073/pnas.94.13.6809. ISSN 0027-8424. PMC 21240. PMID 11038553.
- Yu, Jianming; Pressoir, Gael; Briggs, William H.; Vroh Bi, Irie; Yamasaki, Masanori; Doebley, John F.; McMullen, Michael D.; Gaut, Brandon S.; Nielsen, Dahlia M.; Holland, James B.; Kresovich, Stephen; Buckler, Edward S. (February 2006). "A unified mixed-model method for association mapping that accounts for multiple levels of relatedness". Nature Genetics. 38 (2): 203–208. doi:10.1038/ng1702. ISSN 1546-1718. PMID 16380716. S2CID 8507433.
- Wright, Stephen I.; Bi, Irie Vroh; Schroeder, Steve G.; Yamasaki, Masanori; Doebley, John F.; McMullen, Michael D.; Gaut, Brandon S. (2005-05-27). "The Effects of Artificial Selection on the Maize Genome". Science. 308 (5726): 1310–1314. doi:10.1126/science.1107891. ISSN 0036-8075. PMID 15919994. S2CID 25581643.
