= Walter Fitch =

Walter Fitch may refer to:

- Walter M. Fitch (1929–2011), American evolutionary biologist
- Walter Hood Fitch (1817–1892), Scottish botanical artist
