= Mary J. O'Connell =

Irish genomicist

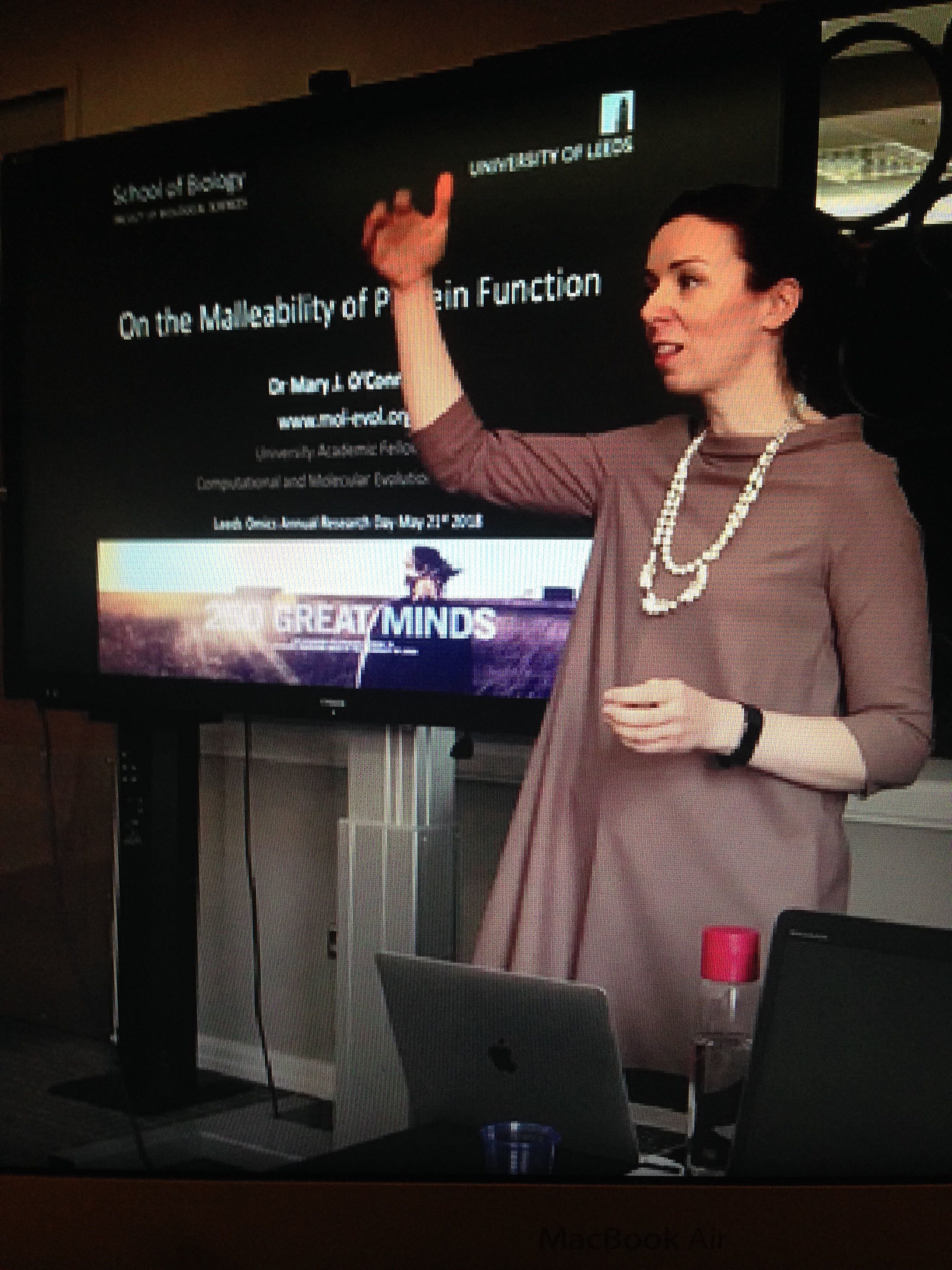
- O'Connell giving the plenary lecture at the 2018 LeedsOmics Symposium held at the University of Leeds

Academic background
- Education: Maynooth University

Academic work
- Discipline: Evolutionary genomics
- Institutions: University of Nottingham; Dublin City University
- Main interests: Phylogenomics; Protein evolution Evolutionary theory Adaptation

Mary J. O'Connell is an evolutionary genomicist and Associate Professor at the University of Nottingham. She is the Principal Investigator of the Computational & Molecular Evolutionary Biology Group in the School of Life Sciences at the University of Nottingham.

== Education ==
O'Connell is from Banagher on the Shannon, County Offaly, Ireland. She received her BSc in Biotechnology with Chemistry, and then PhD in Computational Molecular Evolution in 2005, from the University of Maynooth. Her PhD explored heterogeneity in rates of change between human and mouse protein-coding genes, selective pressure variation and adaptation. Later she spent six months as a Science Foundation Ireland postdoctoral researcher at University College Cork, working on genomic imprinting, selection and conflict theory, before starting her own independent research group.

== Lab Members ==
O'Connell's current team members are Dr. Vladimir Ovchinnikov, Dr. Charley McCarthy, Peter Mulhair, Alysha Taylor, David Orr, Ioannis Tsagakis, Georgios Nikolopoulos, Isabel Bird. O’Connell’s past lab members include Dr. Ann McCartney, Dr. Bede Constantinides, Dr. Karen Siu Ting, Katie Nicoll Baines, Natacha Chenevoy, Dr. Andrew E. Webb, Dr. Kathryn McRae, Dr. Ishani Sinha, Dr. Raymond J. Moran, Dr. Edel Hyland, Dr. Mark Lynch, Dr. Claire C. Morgan. Dr. Thomas A. Walsh, Katie Lee, Kabita Shakya, and Dr. Noeleen Loughran.

== Career ==
O'Connell was appointed as lecturer and Principal Investigator at Dublin City University (DCU) in 2005 when she established her independent research group. She became tenured at 27 and went on to be promoted to senior lecturer and then Deputy Head of Department at the School of Biotechnology, Dublin City University. In 2012, she became a Fulbright scholar awardee and spent a sabbatical year as Fulbright Visiting Professor at Harvard University in the Department of Organismal and Evolutionary Biology and the Museum of Comparative Zoology. She worked with Professor Scott Edwards and his group during her sabbatical. In September 2015, she left DCU to take up her "250 Great Minds University Academic Fellowship" at the University of Leeds. In July 2018, she was appointed as an Associate Professor in the School of Life Sciences at the University of Nottingham, where she is currently based.

== Research ==
Her lab's research areas are primarily focused around four research topics - phylogenomics, mechanisms of protein evolution, evolutionary theory and adaptation. The research is applied to a broad spectrum of areas including understanding the origins of eukaryotic life, speciation events and rapid evolutionary adaptations in polar bears, uncovering the evolution of sweet taste receptors in hummingbirds, identifying the molecular adaptions to the evolution of longevity in bowhead whales, resolving the mammalian phylogeny, and teasing apart the role of microRNAs in the evolution of the placenta.

Along with her PhD students, Andrew Webb and Thomas Walsh, and later her postdoc Bede Constantinides, she wrote and published the software VESPA, a tool for accessible large-scale evolutionary and selective pressure analyses.

== Professional activities ==
O'Connell is a council member for the Society for Molecular Biology and Evolution, and is an Associate Editor for both of the Society's Journals (GBE and MBE).

She was a co-organiser of the 2012 annual Society for Molecular Biology and Evolution meeting in Dublin, Ireland, which was attended by 1,300 delegates. She has organised and taught on EMBO advanced courses in Phylogenetics and phylogenomics in Maynooth, Ireland (2004), Medellin, Colombia (2009), Erice, Sicily (2013) and Iquitos, Peru (2016)

At the University of Leeds, along with Dr. Niamh Forde and Dr. Julie Aspden, O'Connell set up the Leedsomics research institute. The mission of "LeedsOmics" is to unify the large number of ‘omics’ researchers at the University of Leeds into a single community. It includes 38 research groups from a range of fields and runs an annual Research Symposium.

In 2015, O'Connell gave a Tedx talk at Dublin City University on "How to survive in a changing world"

== Awards and honours ==
- 2012 Fulbright Research Scholar Award
- 2017 Elected as Fellow of the Linnean Society
