= James O. McInerney =

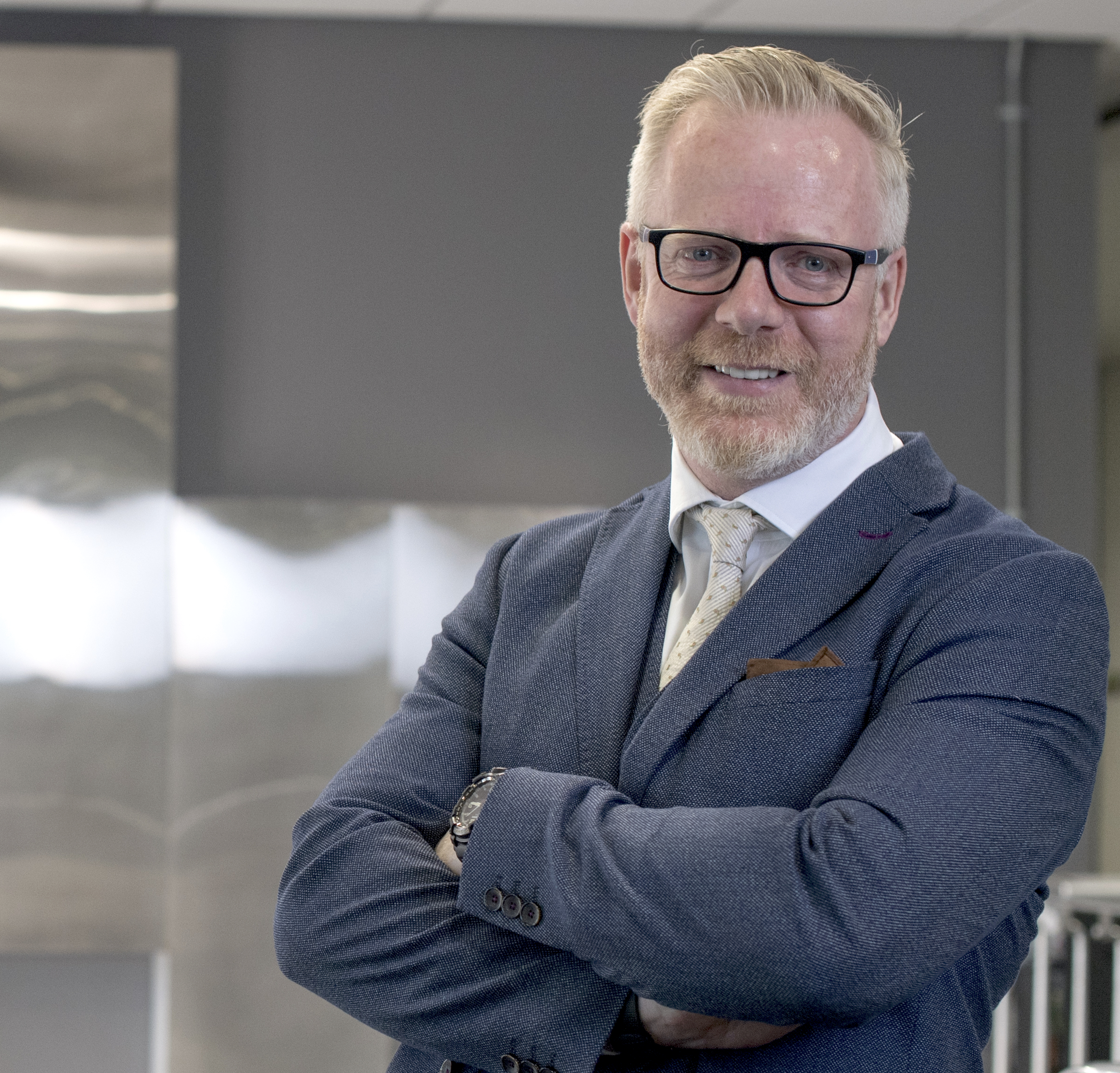
James McInerney at the School of Life Sciences, University of Nottingham.

James O. McInerney is an Irish-born microbiologist, computational evolutionary biologist, professor, and former head of the School of Life Sciences at the University of Nottingham. He is an elected Fellow of the European Academy of Microbiology, of the American Society for Microbiology, and of the Linnean Society. In June 2020 he was elected president-designate of the Society for Molecular Biology and Evolution and in 2022 he took up the role of President. He is deputy chair of BBSRC committee C.

== Early life and education ==
McInerney completed his bachelor's degree at NUI Galway. In 1994, he was awarded a PhD (also from NUI Galway). In 2013, he was awarded a Doctor of Science (DSc) degree from the National University of Ireland.

== Career and research ==
After completing his PhD, McInerney worked as a postdoctoral researcher at the National Diagnostics Centre in Galway and in the Department of Zoology at The Natural History Museum, London. In 1999, McInerney returned to Ireland to set up the Bioinformatics Research Group at NUI Maynooth and became the Director of the Genetics and Bioinformatics degree course. In 2012-2013, he took a sabbatical at the Center for Communicable Disease Dynamics at Harvard University. In 2015, the McInerney research group moved to The University of Manchester where McInerney took up a Chair in Evolutionary Biology. In 2016, McInerney was appointed as the Director of the Research Domain of "Evolution, Systems and Genomics " in the Faculty of Biology, Medicine and Health at the University of Manchester. In 2018, McInerney moved from Manchester to the University of Nottingham, to take up the Chair in Evolutionary Biology and the position of Head of the School of Life Sciences. In August 2024, McInerney moved to The University of Liverpool to take up the position of Head of the Department of Evolution, Ecology and Behaviour.

McInerney's early research career focused on the study of codon usage in a variety of organisms including Trichomonas vaginalis and Borrelia burgdorferi. McInerney was the first to show that the leading strands of replication and the lagging strands of replication in a prokaryotic genome could have significantly different codon usage patterns, due to the way in which polymerases replicate DNA. One of his first software packages, GCUA, allowed for the accessible and reproducible analysis of codon usage by other biologists. Since then, the McInerney research group has published several bioinformatic software programs including Clann: Software for inferring phylogenetic supertrees, Crann: Software for inferring selection, Modelgenerator: Amino acid and nucleotide substitution model selection, PutGaps: DNA gapped file from amino acid alignment, and TIGER: Identifying rapidly-evolving characters in evolutionary data.

Currently, the McInerney lab focusses on understanding the origins of eukaryotes, and on understanding horizontal gene transfer, and prokaryotic pangenomes and the assemblage of genes within them

McInerney has been funded by the Biotechnology and Biological Sciences Research Council (BBSRC), Leverhulme Trust, The European Molecular Biology Organisation, and Science Foundation Ireland and with start-up funding from both the University of Manchester and the University of Nottingham.

=== Awards and honours ===
- Elected Fellow of the European Academy of Microbiology (2026).
- Appointed as Senior Editor for Evolution and Responses to Interventions for the journal Microbial Genomics.
- Elected President of the Society for Molecular Biology and Evolution (President-elect for 2021, President in 2022, Past-President for 2023).
- Elected Fellow of the Linnean Society of London (2016).
- Elected Fellow of the American Academy of Microbiology (2015).
- Recognised by the Irish government with a conference ambassador award by the Minister for Tourism (2015).
- Elected secretary of the Society for Molecular Biology and Evolution (2013-2017).
- Associate Editor for Molecular Biology and Evolution (2009-2018)

=== Public outreach ===
- Synopsis of Nature Micro (2017) paper "Why Prokaryotes Have Pangenomes"
- Speaking on Virgin Births (parthenogenesis) for FBMH's science-themed advent calendar
- Synopsis of Nature (2015) paper "Endosymbiotic origin and differential loss of eukaryotic genes"
- Radio interview for RTE's "Bright Sparks" radio series
- Synopsis of polar bear paper Cell (2014) paper "Population Genomics Reveal Recent Speciation and Rapid Evolutionary Adaptation in Polar Bears"
