= Mir-2 microRNA precursor =

Type of RNA

mir-2 microRNA precursor
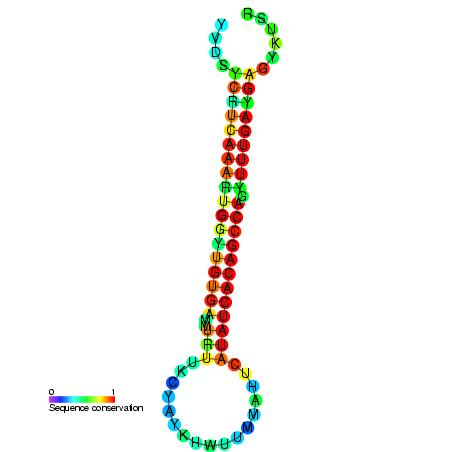
- Predicted secondary structure and sequence conservation of mir-2

Identifiers
- Symbol: mir-2
- Rfam: RF00047
- miRBase: MI0000117
- miRBase family: MIPF0000049

Other data
- RNA type: Gene; miRNA
- Domain: Eukaryota
- GO: GO:0035195 GO:0035068
- SO: SO:0001244
- PDB structures: PDBe

The mir-2 microRNA family includes the microRNA genes mir-2 and mir-13 (MIPF0000049). Mir-2 is widespread in invertebrates, and it is the largest family of microRNAs in the model species Drosophila melanogaster. MicroRNAs from this family are produced from the 3' arm of the precursor hairpin. Leaman et al. showed that the miR-2 family regulates cell survival by translational repression of proapoptotic factors. Based on computational prediction of targets, a role in neural development and maintenance has been suggested.

== Species distribution ==
The mir-2 family is specific to protostomes. There are 8 mir-2-related loci in Drosophila melanogaster: mir-2a-1, mir-2a-2, mir-2b-1, mir-2b-2, mir-2c, mir-13a, mir-13b-1 and mir-13b-2. Most other insect genomes host five mir-2 loci although the number varies in other invertebrates. Mir-13 subfamily emerged from mir-2 sequences before the insect radiation.

Although mir-11 and mir-6 have similar sequences to mir-2 microRNAs, they are not evolutionarily related, and therefore should not be considered from the same microRNA family.

Consensus structure of the mir-2 family hairpin precursor.

Mir-2 hairpin precursor sequences are highly conserved, in particular in their 3' arm in which the first 10 nucleotides are identical to all family members. Functional mir-2 microRNAs come from the 3' arm of the precursors, and most of them have the same Drosha processing point. That means that the seed sequence is virtually the same in all these products, hence, they should target the same transcripts.

Genomic distribution of mir-2 microRNAs in fruitfly and red flour beetle genomes.

Mir-2 microRNAs are organized in a large cluster in most insects. This cluster has typically 5 members of the mir-2 family plus mir-71, an evolutionarily unrelated microRNA. The number of mir-2 sequences differs among invertebrate lineages although they remain tightly clustered in the genome. A notable exception has been observed in Drosophila melanogaster, in which the mir-2 family is organized in two clusters and two single loci. Additionally, mir-7 microRNA has been lost in the Drosophila lineage.

== Origin and evolution ==
The mir-2 family originated before the last common ancestor of protostomes, and has been ever since linked to mir-71. The evolution of mir-2 is characterized by successive expansions by duplication events. Since most paralogous microRNAs conserve their function, it has been suggested that mir-2 evolution is dominated by a birth-and-death dynamics driven by random drift.

One mir-2 microRNA in Drosophila, dme-miR-2a-2 , is two nucleotides offset with respect to the canonical products of other mir-2 precursors. This is likely to affect the function of that particular microRNA. This functional shift is associated to a change in the genomic distribution of mir-2 sequences in Drosophila. The functional diversification of microRNAs may require breaking the genomic linkage between paralogs, probably to avoid the co-regulation of multiple products by the same regulatory sequences.

In the human parasite Schistosoma mansoni the whole mir-71/mir-2 cluster has been duplicated, and one of the copies is in the sexual chromosome.

== Targets of mir-2/mir-13 ==
Mir-2 microRNAs in Drosophila specifically target three pro-apoptotic genes: rpr, grim and skl. The repression of rpr and grim by the Hox gene ABD-B prevents apoptosis in neural cells. On the other hand, computational prediction of microRNA targets show that mir-2 may target neural genes in both Drosophila and Caenorhabditis elegans. All this suggests a conserved role of mir-2 in neural development and maintenance. However, further experiments are required to confirm this association.

== See also ==
- MicroRNA
- Gene expression
- Hox genes
