= Jeffrey R. Powell =

American evolutionary geneticist

- Education: University of Notre Dame (B.S.); University of California, Davis (Ph.D.)
- Known for: Research on Drosophila molecular evolution and Aedes aegypti genetics and domestication; President of the Society for Molecular Biology and Evolution (2005)
- Spouse: Adalgisa Caccone
- Scientific career
- Fields: Evolutionary biology Population genetics Medical entomology
- Workplaces: Yale University

Jeffrey R. Powell is an American evolutionary geneticist and professor emeritus at Yale University. He is known for his research in molecular evolution, population genetics, and the genetics of Drosophila and disease-vector mosquitoes, particularly Aedes aegypti. He served as President of the Society for Molecular Biology and Evolution (SMBE) in 2005.

== Early life and education ==
Powell completed his undergraduate studies at the University of Notre Dame, graduating with a B.S. in biology. In 1969 he began graduate work at The Rockefeller University under Theodosius Dobzhansky, focusing on empirical population genetics using Drosophila. In 1971 he moved with Dobzhansky to the University of California, Davis, where he received his Ph.D. in genetics in 1972.

== Career ==
Powell joined the Yale University faculty in 1972 as an assistant professor in the Department of Biology (later Ecology and Evolutionary Biology). He has remained affiliated with Yale throughout his career, later serving as professor, research professor, and professor emeritus. He has held adjunct appointments in the Yale School of Forestry & Environmental Studies and the School of Public Health (Epidemiology of Microbial Diseases). Since 1994 he has also been an Overseas Fellow at Churchill College, University of Cambridge.

In 2005 he was elected president of the Society for Molecular Biology and Evolution, the leading international scholarly society in the field of molecular evolution.

== Research ==
Powell’s research spans basic evolutionary genetics—primarily using Drosophila as a model organism—and applied studies on the genetics of mosquitoes that transmit human diseases. His work has included worldwide surveys of genetic diversity in Aedes aegypti (the yellow fever mosquito) and studies of chromosomal inversions, codon usage bias, and speciation mechanisms.

He has contributed to understanding the domestication history, global spread, and vector competence of Aedes aegypti, including genomic analyses that link mosquito genetics with historical epidemiological records of diseases such as yellow fever, dengue, Zika, and chikungunya. His laboratory has also conducted conservation-genetics research on Galápagos tortoises and other species.

In 2025 he published Three Mosquitoes: The Biology of Deadly Insects (Johns Hopkins Press), which synthesizes his decades of research on mosquito biology, evolution, and disease transmission intended as an introduction to mosquito research.

== Selected publications ==
- Powell, J. R. (1997). Progress and Prospects in Evolutionary Biology: The Drosophila Model. Oxford University Press. ISBN 978-0-19-507691-2
- Powell, J. R. and Moriyama, E. N. (1997). Evolution of codon usage bias in Drosophila. Proceedings of the National Academy of Sciences, USA, 94:7784-7790.
- Gloria-Soria, A. et al. (2016). Global genetic diversity of Aedes aegypti. Molecular Ecology, 25:5377-5395.
- Powell, J. R., Gloria-Soria, A. and Kotsakiozi, P. (2018). Recent history of Aedes aegypti: Vector genomics and epidemiology records. BioScience, 68:854-860.
