= Michael T. Clegg =

American plant geneticist (born 1941)

- Born: August 1, 1941 (age 85); Pasadena, California
- Education: University of California, Davis
- Awards: Guggenheim Fellowship
- Scientific career
- Fields: Plant genetics
- Workplaces: University of California, Riverside; University of California, Irvine
- Thesis: Patterns of genetic differentiation in natural populations of wild oats (1972)
- Doctoral students: Brandon Gaut

Michael Tran Clegg (born August 1, 1941) is an American plant geneticist. He is professor emeritus of ecology and evolutionary biology in the School of Biological Sciences at the University of California, Irvine (UC Irvine).

== Early life and education ==
Clegg was born on August 1, 1941, in Pasadena, California. His father and grandfather were biologists, and his great-grandfather was a doctor. Despite his family's scientific background, Clegg originally worked for a crop duster, served in the 101st Airborne Division of the US Army from 1960 to 63 and later worked in the sugar industry, before entering college. He obtained his Ph.D. from the University of California, Davis in 1972.

== Academic career ==
Clegg served on the faculty of Brown University from 1972 until 1976 when he assumed a faculty appointment as associate professor at the University of Georgia. In 1984, he joined the faculty of the University of California, Riverside as Professor of Genetics, and subsequently served as Dean of the College of Natural and Agricultural Sciences from 1994 to 2000. In 2004 he left UC Riverside to join the faculty of UC Irvine where he was the Donald Bren Professor of Biological Sciences until he retired in 2014. Since then, he has been a professor emeritus at UC Irvine.

== Honors and professional affiliations ==
Clegg was a Guggenheim Fellow in 1981 and served as president of the American Genetic Association in 1987. In 1990, he was elected a member of the National Academy of Sciences, and he was elected a fellow of the American Academy of Arts and Sciences in 1992. In 2000, he was elected president of the Society for Molecular Biology and Evolution. In 2002, he was elected to the first of three four-year terms as Foreign Secretary of the National Academy of Sciences. He was elected a member of the American Philosophical Society in 2012. He was elected co-Chair of the InterAmerican Network of Academies of Science (IANAS) in 2010 and re-elected in 2013 and he served as Vice President of the International Council for Science (ICSU) from 2014 to 2018. He was elected Council Chair of the International Institute for Applied Systems Analysis in September 2017.
