= Mike Steel (mathematician) =

New Zealand mathematician and statistician (born 1960)

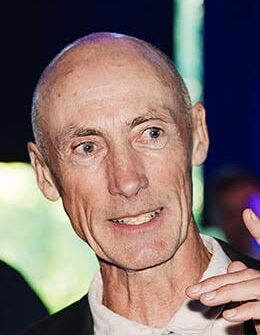
Steel in 2025

Michael Anthony Steel (born May 1960) is a New Zealand mathematician and statistician, a distinguished professor of mathematics and statistics and the director of the Biomathematics Research Centre at the University of Canterbury in Christchurch, New Zealand. He is known for his research on modelling and reconstructing evolutionary trees.

== Biography ==
Steel studied at the University of Canterbury, earning a bachelor's degree in 1982, a masters in 1983, and a degree in journalism in 1985. He then moved to Massey University, where he received his Ph.D. in 1989, supervised by Michael Hendy and David Penny. He joined the Canterbury faculty in 1994.

== Awards and honours ==
Steel won the Hamilton Memorial Prize of the Royal Society of New Zealand in 1994; this prize is given annually to a New Zealand mathematician for work done within five years of a Ph.D.

In 1999 he won the research award of the New Zealand Mathematical Society "for his fundamental contributions to the mathematical understanding of phylogeny, demonstrating a capacity for hard creative work in combinatorics and statistics and an excellent understanding of the biological implications of his results."

He became a fellow of the Royal Society of New Zealand in 2003.

In 2018, Steel was elected as a Fellow of the International Society for Computational Biology, for his outstanding contributions to the fields of computational biology and bioinformatics.

== Selected publications ==
- Lockhart, Peter J., Michael A. Steel, Michael D. Hendy, and David Penny. "Recovering evolutionary trees under a more realistic model of sequence evolution." Molecular biology and evolution 11, no. 4 (1994): 605–612.
- Esser, Christian, Nahal Ahmadinejad, Christian Wiegand, Carmen Rotte, Federico Sebastiani, Gabriel Gelius-Dietrich, Katrin Henze et al. "A genome phylogeny for mitochondria among α-proteobacteria and a predominantly eubacterial ancestry of yeast nuclear genes." Molecular Biology and Evolution 21, no. 9 (2004): 1643–1660.
- Erdős, Péter L., Michael A. Steel, László A. Székely, and Tandy J. Warnow. "A few logs suffice to build (almost) all trees (I)." Random Structures & Algorithms 14, no. 2 (1999): 153–184.
- Erdös, Péter L., Michael A. Steel, LászlóA Székely, and Tandy J. Warnow. "A few logs suffice to build (almost) all trees: part II." Theoretical Computer Science 221, no. 1-2 (1999): 77–118.
