= Mir-11 microRNA precursor family =

Precursor microRNA family

mir-11

Identifiers
- Symbol: mir-11
- Rfam: RF00813
- miRBase family: 2

Other data
- RNA type: microRNA
- Domain(s): Eukaryota;
- PDB structures: PDBe

In molecular biology mir-11 microRNA is a short RNA molecule. MicroRNAs function to regulate the expression levels of other genes by several mechanisms. There is an evidence to suggest that miR-11 plays a role in apoptosis.

Alignment has shown that miR-11 shares the same family motif as miR-2b and miR-6, together making up the mir-2 clan. There is however little similarity in the 3' ends between these clan members.

== See also ==
- MicroRNA
