= Bruce Weir =

New Zealand biostatistician (born 1943)

- Born: Bruce Spencer Weir; 31 December 1943 (age 82); Christchurch, New Zealand
- Education: University of Canterbury (BSc (Hons), 1965); North Carolina State University (PhD, 1968)
- Spouse: Beth Weir
- Children: Claudia Beth; Henry Bruce
- Awards: Guggenheim Fellowship (1983)
- Scientific career
- Fields: Biostatistics; Statistical genetics
- Workplaces: University of Washington
- Thesis: The Two Locus Inbreeding Function (1968)
- Doctoral advisor: C. Clark Cockerham
- Doctoral students: Rebecca Doerge
- Other notable students: Brandon Gaut

Bruce Spencer Weir (born 31 December 1943) is a New Zealand biostatistician and statistical geneticist. He is Professor of Biostatistics and Professor of Genome Sciences at the University of Washington. He was previously the William Neal Reynolds Professor of statistics and genetics and director of the Bioinformatics Research Center at North Carolina State University. He is known within academia for his research in statistical and forensic genetics, and outside academia for testifying in the O.J. Simpson murder trial in 1995.

== Early life and education ==
Weir was born in Christchurch, New Zealand, the oldest child of Gordon and Peg Weir. He was a foundation pupil of Shirley Boys' High School. He went to the University of Canterbury and was the first in his family to go to university. He gained his PhD in statistics at the North Carolina State University.

== Testimony in O.J. Simpson murder case ==
During his testimony in the O. J. Simpson murder case, Weir was pressed by lawyer Peter Neufeld on his failure to include a certain genetic marker in his calculations of some of the DNA frequencies he had analyzed. In response, Weir acknowledged that he had in fact made a calculation error in failing to include this marker in all of his analyses of DNA samples in the case. Lawyers for the defense used this admission to attempt to undermine Weir's credibility, despite the fact that the error had little effect on the validity of the DNA evidence that had been presented. Weir subsequently recalculated his statistics and described his new findings in a subsequent day of testimony. Weir stated that after redoing his calculations, the odds that a blood mixture sample taken from the steering wheel of Simpson's Ford Bronco came from two unknown people increased from 1 in 59 to 1 in 26. Similarly, the equivalent odds for a blood mixture found on a glove outside Simpson's home were revised upward from 1 in 3,900 to 1 in 1,600. In his redirect examination that day, Weir asserted that the difference between his new and original results was not very statistically significant.

== Honors and awards ==
Weir was a Guggenheim Fellow in 1983. He was named a fellow of the American Association for the Advancement of Science in 1998 and of the American Statistical Association in 1999. He received the O. Max Gardner Award from the University of North Carolina system in 2003. In 2019, he received the Elizabeth W. Jones Award for Excellence in Education from the Genetics Society of America. In 2021 he was elected a Fellow of the Royal Society.

== Personal life ==
Weir is married to Beth Weir, an academic with interests in reading education. They have two children.
