= Margaret Kidwell =

American biologist

Margaret G. Kidwell
- Born: Margaret Mary Gale; August 17, 1933; Askham, Nottinghamshire, UK
- Education: University of Nottingham (B.Sc., 1953); Iowa State University (M.S., 1962); Brown University(Ph.D., 1973)
- Known for: Evolution of transposable elements in Drosophila
- Spouse(s): James F. Kidwell (1961-1988); Lee L. Sims (2013-2020)
- Scientific career
- Fields: Genetics; Evolutionary Biology
- Workplaces: Brown University; University of Arizona
- Thesis: An investigation of some genetic properties of a mutator mechanism in Drosophila melanogaster (1974)
- Doctoral advisor: Masatoshi Nei

Margaret Gale Kidwell (born August 17, 1933) is a British American evolutionary biologist and Regents' Professor Emerita at the University of Arizona, Tucson. She grew up on a farm in the English Midlands during World War II. After graduating from the University of Nottingham in 1953, she worked in the British Civil Service as an Agricultural Advisory Officer from 1955 to 1960. She moved to the US in 1960 under the auspices of a Kellogg Foundation Fellowship to study Genetics and Statistics at Iowa State University. She married quantitative geneticist James F. Kidwell in 1961, obtained her MS degree in 1962 and moved with her husband to Brown University in 1963. She received her PhD from Brown University in 1973 under the guidance of Masatoshi Nei. From 1973 to 1984 she pursued independent research into a number of anomalous genetic phenomena in Drosophila which later lead to collaborative studies resulting in the discovery of hybrid dysgenesis and the isolation of transposable P elements. After appointment as Professor of Biology at Brown University in 1984 she moved to the University of Arizona in 1985 as Professor of Ecology and Evolutionary Biology. Additional positions included Chair of the Interdisciplinary Genetics Program from 1988 to 1991 and Head of the Department of Ecology and Evolutionary Biology from 1992 to 1997. Research at the University of Arizona has increasingly focused on the evolutionary significance of transposable genetic elements.

== Honours and awards ==
Kidwell was elected fellow of the American Association for the Advancement of Science in 1992. In 1993 she was elected fellow of American Academy of Arts and Sciences. By 1994 she became a regent professor of Ecology and Evolutionary Biology at University of Arizona. She was a recipient of the Key Distinguished Lecture award for the American Genetic Association in 1991. In 1996, she was the first woman from Arizona to be elected to the United States National Academy of Sciences.

== Selected publications ==
- Kidwell, M. G. 1972. Genetic change of recombination value in Drosophila melanogaster: I. Artificial selection for high and low recombination and some properties of recombination-modifying genes. Genetics 70: 419-432.
- Kidwell, M. G., J. F. Kidwell & M. Nei 1973. A case of high rate of spontaneous mutation affecting viability in Drosophila melanogaster. Genetics 75: 133-153.
- Kidwell, M. G., J. F. Kidwell & J. A. Sved 1977. Hybrid dysgenesis in D. melanogaster: a syndrome of aberrant traits including mutation, sterility & male recombination. Genetics 86: 813–833.
- Rubin, G. M., M. G. Kidwell & P. M. Bingham 1982. The molecular basis of P-M hybrid dysgenesis: The nature of induced mutations. Cell 29: 987-994.
- Kidwell, M. G. 1983. Evolution of hybrid dysgenesis determinants in Drosophila melanogaster. Proc. Nat. Acad. Sci. USA 80: 1655-1659.
- Kidwell, M. G. and D. Lisch. 1997. Transposable elements as sources of variation in animals and plants. Proc. Natl. Acad. Sci. 94: 7704-7711.
- Kidwell, M. G. and D. R. Lisch (2001) Perspective: Transposable elements, parasitic DNA and genome evolution. Evolution 55:1-24.
- Kidwell, M. G. and D. R. Lisch 2017. Hybrid Dysgenesis. In Reference Module in Life Sciences, Elsevier, Oxford.
