= Masatoshi Nei =

Japanese-American geneticist (1931–2023)

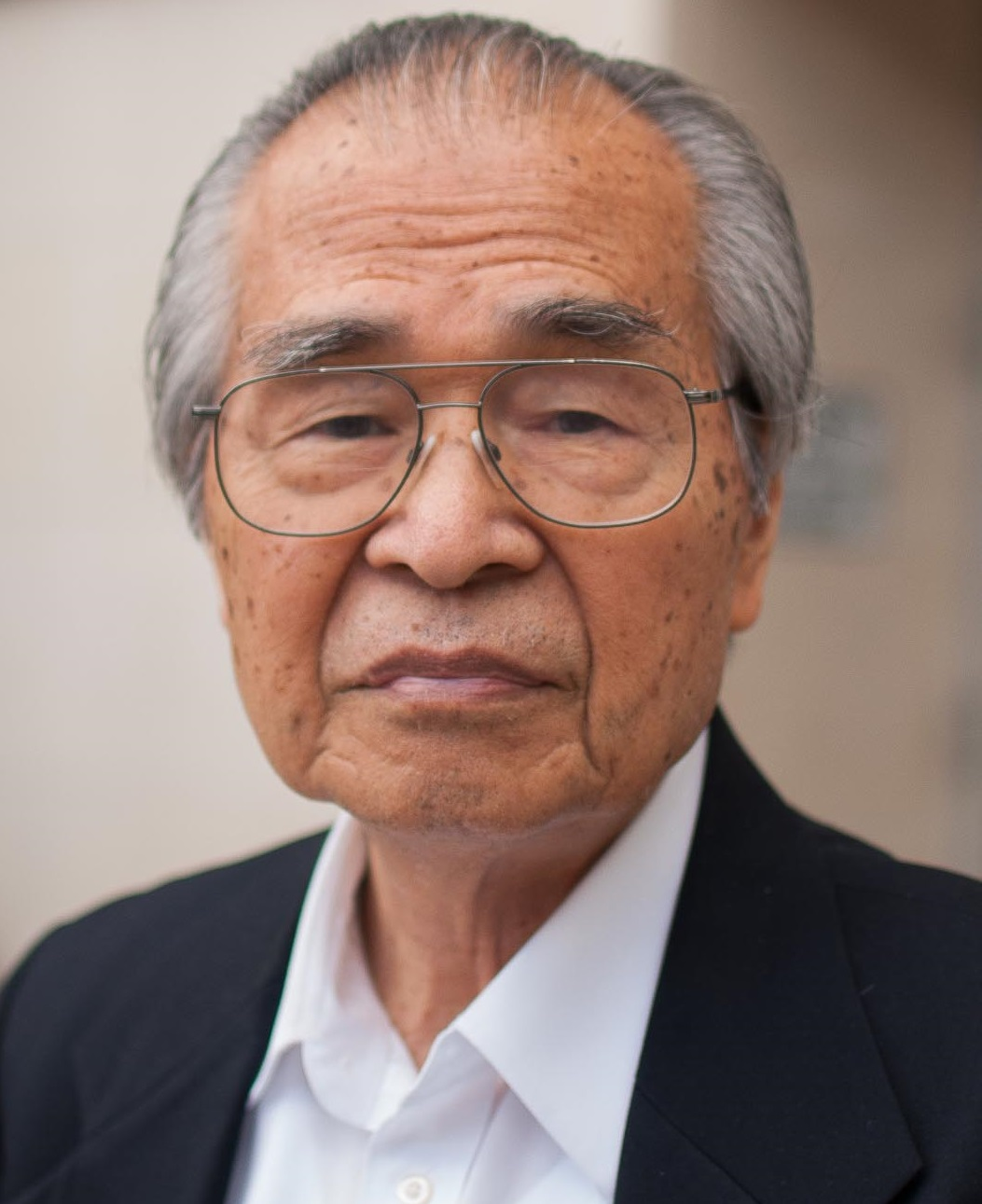
- Masatoshi in 2013
- Born: January 2, 1931; Miyazaki Prefecture, Japan
- Died: May 18, 2023 (aged 92); Moorestown, New Jersey, U.S.
- Education: Kyoto University; University of Miyazaki
- Known for: Statistical theories of molecular evolution and development of the theory of mutation-driven evolution
- Awards: John Scott Medal (2017); Kyoto Prize (2013); Thomas Hunt Morgan Medal (2006); International Prize for Biology (2002)
- Scientific career
- Fields: Evolutionary biology
- Workplaces: Temple University; Pennsylvania State University; University of Texas Health Science Center at Houston; Brown University; National Institute of Radiological Sciences; Kyoto University
- Thesis: 統計遺伝学の育種への応用に関する研究 (Studies on the Application of Biometrical Genetics to Plant Breeding) (1959)
- Doctoral advisor: Katsumi Akato
- Doctoral students: Dan Graur; Margaret Kidwell; Aravinda Chakravarti
- Website: igem.temple.edu/labs/nei

Masatoshi Nei (根井正利, Nei Masatoshi; January 2, 1931 – May 18, 2023) was a Japanese-born American evolutionary biologist.

== Professional life ==
Masatoshi Nei was born in 1931 in Miyazaki Prefecture, on Kyūshū Island, Japan.

He received a Bachelor of Science degree from the University of Miyazaki in 1953, and published his first article, on the mathematics of plant breeding, that same year. In 1959, he completed his doctoral degree at Kyoto University on quantitative genetics for crop improvement.

For the next decade, Nei worked in Japan, including as a research scientist at the National Institute of Radiological Sciences, before emigrating to the United States in 1969.

Nei was associate professor and professor of biology at Brown University from 1969 to 1972 and professor of population genetics at the Center for Demographic and Population Genetics, University of Texas Health Science Center at Houston (UTHealth), from 1972 to 1990.

He was later an Evan Pugh Professor of Biology at Pennsylvania State University and Director of the Institute of Molecular Evolutionary Genetics, working there from 1990 to 2015.

From 2015, Nei was affiliated with the Department of Biology at Temple University as an adjunct Laura H. Carnell Professor.

Acting alone or working with his students, he has continuously developed statistical methods for studying molecular evolution taking into account discoveries in molecular biology. He has also developed concepts in evolutionary theory and advanced the theory of mutation-driven evolution.

Together with Walter Fitch, Nei co-founded the journal Molecular Biology and Evolution in 1983 and the Society for Molecular Biology and Evolution in 1993.

== Work in population genetics ==
=== Theoretical studies ===
Nei was the first to show mathematically that, in the presence of gene interaction, natural selection always tends to enhance the linkage intensity between genetic loci or maintain the same linkage relationship. He then observed that the average recombination value per genome is generally lower in higher organisms than in lower organisms and attributed this observation to his theory of linkage modification. Recent molecular data indicate that many sets of interacting genes such as the Hox genes, immunoglobulin genes, and histone genes have often existed as gene clusters for a long evolutionary time. This observation can also be explained by his theory of linkage modification. He also showed that, unlike R. A. Fisher's argument, deleterious mutations can accumulate rather quickly on the Y chromosome or duplicate genes in finite populations.

In 1969, considering the rates of amino acid substitution, gene duplication, and gene inactivation, he predicted that higher organisms contain a large number of duplicate genes and nonfunctional genes (now called pseudogenes). This prediction was shown to be correct when many multigene families and pseudogenes were discovered in the 1980s and 1990s.

His notable contribution in the early 1970s is the proposal of a new measure of genetic distance (Nei's distance) between populations and its use for studying evolutionary relationships of populations or closely related species. He later developed another distance measure called D_{A}, which is appropriate for finding the topology of a phylogenetic tree of populations. He also developed statistics of measuring the extent of population differentiation for any types of mating system using the G_{ST} measure. In 1975, he and collaborators presented a mathematical formulation of population bottleneck effects and clarified the genetic meaning of bottleneck effects. In 1979, he proposed a statistical measure called nucleotide diversity, which is now widely used for measuring the extent of nucleotide polymorphism. He also developed several different models of speciation and concluded that the reproductive isolation between species occurs as a passive process of accumulation of interspecific incompatibility mutations

=== Protein polymorphism and neutral theory ===
In the early 1960s and 1970s, there was a great controversy over the mechanism of protein evolution and the maintenance of protein polymorphism. Nei and his collaborators developed various statistical methods for testing the neutral theory of molecular evolution using polymorphism data. Their analysis of the allele frequency distribution, the relationship between average heterozygosity and protein divergence between species, etc., showed that a large portion of protein polymorphism can be explained by neutral theory. The only exception was the major histocompatibility complex (MHC) loci, which show an extraordinarily high degree of polymorphism. For these reasons, he accepted the neutral theory of evolution.

== Human evolution ==
Using his genetic distance theory, he and A. K. Roychoudhury showed that the genetic variation between Europeans, Asians, and Africans is only about 11 percent of the total genetic variation of the human population. They then estimated that Europeans and Asians diverged about 55,000 years ago and these two populations diverged from Africans about 115,000 years ago. This conclusion was supported by many later studies using larger numbers of genes and populations, and the estimates appear to be still roughly correct. This finding could be considered an early indication of the out-of-Africa theory of human origins.

== Molecular phylogenetics ==
Around 1980, Nei and his students initiated a study of inference of phylogenetic trees based on distance data. In 1985, they developed a statistical method for testing the accuracy of a phylogenetic tree by examining the statistical significance of interior branch lengths. They then developed the neighbor joining and minimum-evolution methods of tree inference. They also developed statistical methods for estimating evolutionary times from molecular phylogenies. In collaboration with Sudhir Kumar and Koichiro Tamura, he developed a widely used computer program package for phylogenetic analysis called MEGA.

== MHC loci and positive Darwinian selection ==
Nei's group invented a simple statistical method for detecting positive Darwinian selection by comparing the numbers of synonymous nucleotide substitutions and nonsynonymous nucleotide substitutions. Applying this method, they showed that the exceptionally high degree of sequence polymorphism at MHC loci is caused by overdominant selection. Although various statistical methods for this test have been developed later, their original methods are still widely used.

== New evolutionary concepts ==
Nei and his students studied the evolutionary patterns of a large number of multigene families and showed that they generally evolve following the model of a birth–death process. In some gene families, this process is very fast, caused by random events of gene duplication and gene deletion and generates genomic drift of gene copy number. Nei has long maintained the view that the driving force of evolution is mutation, including any types of DNA changes (nucleotide changes, chromosomal changes, and genome duplication), and that natural selection is primarily a force eliminating less fit genotypes (i.e., theory of mutation-driven evolution). He conducted statistical analyzes of evolution of genes controlling phenotypic characters such as immunity and olfactory reception and obtained evidence supporting this theory.

== Personal life ==
Masatoshi Nei was born in 1931 Japan, and his lifelong interest in biology and genetics may have its roots in his upbringing on a farm, in a family of farmers. After completing his undergraduate and doctorate degrees in Japan, Nei emigrated to the United States in 1969. Nei was married with two children and two grandchildren, and enjoyed listening to classical music and sculpting topiary. In 2014, Nei suffered a stroke and moved to New Jersey after retiring from Pennsylvania State University. Nei died in Moorestown, New Jersey on May 18, 2023, at the age of 92.

== Select awards and honors ==
- 2017: John Scott Medal
- 2013: Kyoto Prize in Basic Sciences
- 2006: Thomas Hunt Morgan Medal
- 2002: Honorary Doctorate, University of Miyazaki
- 2002: International Prize for Biology, Japan Society for the Promotion of Science
- 1997: Member, National Academy of Sciences

== Books ==
- Nei, M. (2020) My Life as a Molecular Evolutionist. Blurb, self-published.
- Nei, M.(2013) Mutation-Driven Evolution. Oxford University Press, Oxford.
- Nei, M., and S. Kumar (2000) Molecular Evolution and Phylogenetics. Oxford University Press, Oxford.
- National Research Council, (1996) The Evaluation of DNA Forensic Evidence. National Academies Press, Washington D.C.
- Roychoudhury, A. K., and M. Nei (1988) Human Polymorphic Genes: World Distribution. Oxford University Press, Oxford and New York.
- Nei, M. (1987) Molecular Evolutionary Genetics. Columbia University Press, New York.
- Nei, M., and R. K. Koehn (eds). (1983) Evolution of Genes and Proteins. Sinauer Assoc., Sunderland, MA.
- Nei, M. (1975) Molecular Population Genetics and Evolution. North-Holland, Amsterdam and New York.
