= Society for Molecular Biology and Evolution =

The Society for Molecular Biology and Evolution (SMBE) is a scientific and academic organization founded in 1982 to support academic research in the field of molecular evolution. The society hosts an annual meeting, typically in June or July. It also supports satellite meetings throughout the year. The Society's first president was evolutionary biologist Walter M. Fitch. The current President is Ziheng Yang.

== Publishing ==
In 1983, the society began publishing the journal Molecular Biology and Evolution with Oxford University Press. The society began publishing a second journal, Genome Biology and Evolution, in 2009.

== Presidents ==
2025: Ziheng Yang

2024: Stephen Wright

2023: Kateryna Makova

2022: James McInerney

2021: Harmit Malik

2020: Marta Wayne

2019: Aoife McLysaght

2018: William F. Martin

2017: Laura Landweber

2016: Jianzhi (George) Zhang

2015: Joe Felsenstein

2014: Brandon Gaut

2013: Sudhir Kumar

2012: Charles Aquadro

2011: Ken Wolfe

2010: Jody Hey

2009: Michael Lynch

2008: Paul Sharp

2007: Deborah Charlesworth

2006: Montserrat Aguadé

2005: Jeffrey R. Powell

2004: John C. Avise

2003: Naoyuki Takahata

2002: Michael T. Clegg

2001: Daniel L. Hartl

2000: Wen-Hsiung Li

1999: Andrew G. Clark

1998: Richard C. Lewontin

1997: David Penny

1996: Margaret G. Kidwell

1995: Wesley M. Brown

1994: Masatoshi Nei

1993: Walter M. Fitch

== See also ==
- List of learned societies
