= Phylomedicine =

Phylomedicine is an emerging discipline at the intersection of medicine, genomics, and evolution. It focuses on the use of evolutionary knowledge to predict functional consequences of mutations found in personal genomes and populations.

== History ==
Modern technologies have made genome sequencing accessible, and biomedical scientists have profiled genomic variation in apparently healthy individuals and individuals diagnosed with a variety of diseases. This work has led to the discovery of thousands of disease-associated genes and genetic variants, elucidating a more robust picture of the amount and types of variations found within and between humans.

Proteins are encoded in genomic DNA by exons, and these comprise only ~1% of the human genomic sequence (aka the exome). The exome of an individual carries about 6,000–10,000 amino-acid-altering nSNVs, and many of these variants are already known to be associated with more than 1000 diseases. Although only a small fraction of these personal variants are likely to impact health, the sheer volume of known genomic and exomic variants is too large to apply traditional laboratory or experimental techniques to explore their functional consequences. Translating a personal genome into useful phenotypic information (e.g. relating to predisposition to disease, differential drug response, or other health concerns), is therefore a grand challenge in the field of genomic medicine.

Fortunately, results from the natural experiment of molecular evolution are recorded in the genomes of humans and other living species. All genomic variation is subjected to the process of natural selection which generally reduces mutations with negative effects on phenotype over time. With the availability of a large number of genomes from the tree of life, evolutionary conservation of individual genomic positions and the sets of mutations permitted among species informs the functional and health consequences of these mutations.

Consequently, phylomedicine has emerged as an important discipline at the intersection of molecular evolution and genomic medicine with a focus on understanding the inherited component of human disease and health. Examples include studies of retinal disease, auditory diseases, and common diseases more generally. Phylomedicine expands the purview of contemporary evolutionary medicine to use evolutionary patterns beyond short-term history (e.g. populations within a species) to the long-term evolutionary history of multispecies genomics.
