= Walter M. Fitch =

American molecular biologist (1929–2011)

Walter Monroe Fitch
- Born: May 21, 1929; San Diego, California, U.S.
- Died: March 10, 2011 (aged 81); Irvine, California, U.S.
- Education: University of California, Berkeley
- Scientific career
- Institutions: University of Wisconsin–Madison; University of Southern California; University of California, Irvine
- Doctoral advisor: Israel Lyon Chaikoff

Walter Monroe Fitch (May 21, 1929 – March 10, 2011) was a pioneering American researcher in molecular evolution.

== Education and career ==
Fitch attended University of California, Berkeley, where he graduated with an A.B. in chemistry in 1953 and a Ph.D. in comparative biochemistry in 1958. Fitch spent 24 years at the University of Wisconsin–Madison, followed by three years at the University of Southern California and then was professor of molecular evolution at the University of California, Irvine, until his death. He was a member of the National Academy of Sciences, the American Philosophical Society, and the American Association for the Advancement of Science, and was a Foreign Member of the London Linnean Society. He co-founded the journal Molecular Biology and Evolution, with Masatoshi Nei, and was the first president of the Society for Molecular Biology and Evolution.

== Research ==
Fitch did pioneering work on reconstruction of phylogenies (evolutionary trees) from protein and DNA sequences. He published the first major paper on distance matrix methods, which introduced the Fitch–Margoliash method with Emanuel Margoliash. It seeks the tree that best predicts a set of pairwise distances among species. He also developed the Fitch maximum parsimony algorithm, which evaluates rapidly and exactly the minimum number of changes of state of a sequence on a given phylogeny. His definition of orthologous sequences has been frequently cited and is used as a reference in many research publications.

== Selected publications ==
- Fitch, W. M. and E. Margoliash. (1967). Construction of phylogenetic trees. Science 155: 279–284.
- Fitch, W. M. (1970). Distinguishing homologous from analogous proteins. Systematic Biology 19 (2): 99-113.
- Fitch, W. M. (1971). Toward defining the course of evolution: minimum change for a specified tree topology. Systematic Zoology 20 (4): 406-416
- Fitch, W. M. (2012). The Three Failures of Creationism: Logic, Rhetoric, and Science. University of California Press.
