= Mir-5 microRNA precursor family =

MicroRNA family

mir-5

Identifiers
- Symbol: mir-5
- Rfam: RF00854
- miRBase family: 2

Other data
- RNA type: microRNA
- Domain(s): Eukaryota;
- PDB structures: PDBe

In molecular biology mir-5 microRNA is a short RNA molecule. MicroRNAs function to regulate the expression levels of other genes by several mechanisms. mir-5 has been implicated in regulation of VEGF in an experiment where a plasmid containing a cluster of mir-5, mir-10 and mir-7 was shown to down-regulate VEGF by 75%. mir-5 in chicken has been implicated in targeting genes involved in metabolism.

== See also ==
- MicroRNA
