= David Penny =

New Zealand biologist (1938–2024)

David Penny CNZM FRSNZ
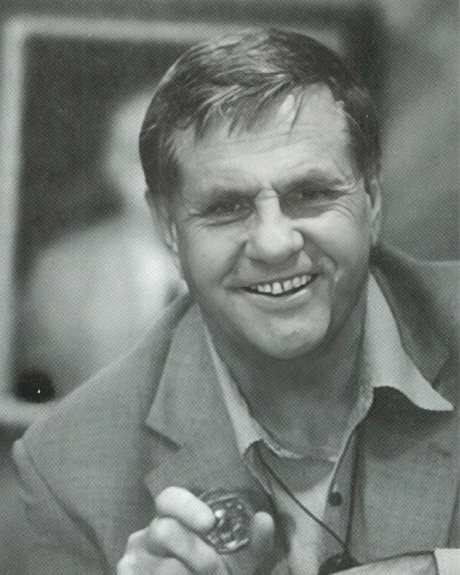
- Penny in 2004
- Born: 28 September 1938; Taumarunui, New Zealand
- Died: 20 May 2024 (aged 85); Palmerston North, New Zealand
- Education: University of Canterbury; Yale University
- Awards: 2000 Marsden Medal; 2004 Rutherford Medal
- Scientific career
- Fields: Theoretical biology
- Workplaces: McMaster University; Massey University
- Doctoral students: Barbara R. Holland; Mike Steel

Edward David Penny CNZM FRSNZ (28 September 1938 – 20 May 2024) was a New Zealand theoretical and evolutionary biologist. He researched the nature of evolutionary transformations, and published widely in the fields of phylogenetic tree, genetics and evolutionary biology. Penny's contributions to science have been recognised with several awards and honours, and acceptance into the National Academy of Sciences.

== Education and career ==
Born in Taumarunui, Penny was educated at New Plymouth Boys' High School, before gaining undergraduate degrees in botany and chemistry at the University of Canterbury. He completed his PhD in botany at Yale University in 1965 and later worked as a postdoctoral researcher at McMaster University. He returned to New Zealand in 1966 and joined the staff at Massey University, within the Department of Plant Biology, School of Biological Sciences, Institute for Molecular BioSciences, and Institute of Fundamental Sciences and in 2005 Penny was named a distinguished professor. From 2002 to 2010, Penny co-led the Allan Wilson Centre, one of the original New Zealand Centres of Research Excellence, hosted at Massey University. Until it closed in 2015, the centre had a focus on researching the evolution and ecology of New Zealand and Pacific plant and animal life. On his retirement in 2017, Penny was accorded the title of professor emeritus by Massey University.

== Selected research ==
Penny's research has focused on theoretical biology, molecular evolution, human evolution, and the history of science.

=== Early work ===
In the 1970s, Penny looked into how genetic information on all forms of life could be used to investigate questions such as the origin of life, the occurrence of evolution and the relationship between species and communities. He helped to develop "mathematical techniques and computer programmes to analyse DNA sequences and construct evolutionary trees...[developing]... new insights that support the idea that humans evolved in and then migrated from Africa and that the first forms of life were based on the simpler RNA molecule rather than DNA". In 1998 he co-authored a paper providing compelling DNA-based evidence that the Māori migration to New Zealand included between 50 and 100 females, a finding noted by the authors as "entirely consistent with Māori oral history as well as the results of recent canoe voyages recreating early trans-oceanic voyages".

=== Phylogenetic trees ===
It has been said that the paper Construction of Phylogenetic Trees (1967) was what first made Penny interested in tracing the process of evolution. One of the authors of that paper, Walter Fitch, reflected in 1988 that the inspiration for their 1967 research was to develop a computer programme that would break the genetic code and develop a "molecular paleontological record in proteins and nucleic acid". Penny's early research challenged the theories of evolution at the time. In looking to clarify a sound basis of classification, in 1982 he entered the controversy about whether relationships between organisms should be expressed in "evolutionary terms, or on clusters based on overall similarity", and concluded that retaining the original data supported sound classification.

Penny was involved in research teams that explored tree building methods. In 1985, he collaborated on work that evaluated the reliability of these, and the research paper concluded that there needed to be a balance between the traditional approach of "weighting the characters" and a computer-based approach utilizing the growing awareness of numerical taxonomy. Another paper in 1992, while noting at times the conventional methods were reliable, also presented a new approach. This was known as LogDet and according to the authors of the paper, "[allowed] tree-selection methods to consistently recover the correct tree when sequences evolve under simple asymmetric models...produce sequences of different nucleotide compositions...and are more realistic than most standard models". In 1993 he co-authored a research paper that took the position progress was being made with methods for evolutionary trees. In the Abstract, the authors explained the signals of macromolecules from a common history and clarified the intention of the research as being to discuss methods that were "efficient (fast), consistent, powerful, robust, and falsifiable", for inferring evolutionary trees from these patterns or signals. The paper concluded that most methods of tree inference needed corrections, but "the recognition that methods may be both efficient and consistent [was] also useful".

=== Evolution of eukaryotes ===
A paper co-authored by Penny in 2006, challenged the prevailing view at the time that eukaryotes had evolved by genome fusion between archaea and bacteria, suggesting they "were more likely to have been reduced by sequence loss and cellular simplification after the possible emergence of a predatory eukaryote. This research was significant because it suggested that modern eukaryote and prokaryote cells had long followed separate evolutionary trajectories, confirming "that evolution does not proceed monotonically from the simpler to the more complex". Penny told NBC News the results may have been surprising to some, but stressed that there was little evidence of the fusion theory explaining "the special genetic and cellular features of the eukaryotes". He suggested it was an example of evolution being "backwards, sideways and occasionally forward". A group of international scientists disputed the findings in the 2006 paper. They claimed the writers had "delivered biased opinions" that presented "an introns-early (and eukaryotes-first) view of early evolution that was current in 1980 and that was shown by conventional scientific criteria to be untenable over a decade ago". In the same journal, Penny et al. responded that new information from cellular and molecular genomics provided previously unavailable information on eukaryote origins. They agreed it was "still premature to decide between introns first, early, or late...nevertheless, our primary conclusion is that there is good progress on understanding the complexity of the ancestral eukaryote cell".

Penny was also part of a research team that explored theories for eukaryote origins and noted some of these ignore life history and ecological principles, and it was necessary to challenge predictions there was a long period in early life with no predators. The authors concluded that their results were "consistent with the expectation that the ability to gain energy via engulfment of other unicells evolved early during evolution...thus from first principles, it is unlikely that there ever was an extended period (1–3 billion years) when there were no predators that lived by engulfing smaller cells". This had implications when considering the most likely time that eukaryotes emerged, and challenged the view that these cells arose sometime between 9.85 ~ 2.75 billion years ago. From the starting point that phagocytotic predators were almost exclusively eukaryotic, the paper maintained that these existed earlier in evolution.

=== Bird evolution ===
After working as a member of a team researching bird evolution in 2008, Penny co-authored the paper of the work which confirmed there were problems in this area for evolutionary biologists. The writers said it was partly due to scientists being mislead by "convergence of morphology...[and]...problems and phylogenies based on short DNA sequences". The paper further attempted to resolve issues around "the relationships between clades and the timing of the evolution of birds", and based on the phylogenetic data, concluded that "seven Metave species do not share a common evolutionary history within the Neoaves". Resolution of controversies around the understanding of the evolutionary relationship between modern birds due to this polytomy at the base of the Neonaves, is the focus of later research in which Penny participated. New developments suggested in this paper included reducing noise level and more accurate use of formulae to find predefined groupings in the optimal tree. Significantly, the research reported the existence of nine new mitochondrial genomes [which] "support a major diversification of at least 12 neoavian lineages in the Late Cretaceous". Penny has also been involved in 2010 research that suggested some ratites nested and therefore had previously flown. One example, the extinct moa, closely related to the tinamou breed of birds from South America, according to Penny may have flown or "was blown, to New Zealand via Antarctica before it froze over".

=== Origin of land plants ===
A paper co-authored by Penny in 1995, noted that more genomic data was needed to "establish and clarify evolutionary relationships...to accurately estimate phylogenetic trees...[for]...the origin of land plants as a prerequisite for understanding the transition from the aquatic to the terrestrial habitat of plants". The paper challenged the view that variability between gene trees from different nuclear genes could lead to a conclusion of a 'supergene' tree, and suggested high levels of variability (hererogeniety) of gene trees needed to be incorporated in research into the origin of land plants. The conclusion was that research indicated the "coalescent method across different subsets of data consistently suggested that the ancestors of Zygnematales are the closest relatives of land plants". Penny was part of a team, that in 2013 continued investigating the relationship between green algae and the evolution of land plants. A paper on the research, co-authored by Penny, concluded that after analysing a chloroplast genome data set, "Zygnematales alone, or a clade consisting of Coleochaetales plus Zygnematales, [are] the closest living relatives of land plants".

=== Viruses ===
In 1989 a team involving Penny used the science of evolutionary trees to analyse sequences from the H1 strand of human viruses and concluded their findings were "in agreement with the biological (evolutionary) model". By 2006 researchers, including Penny, had described the molecular epidemiology of respiratory syncytial virus (RSV), providing key information to aid RSV vaccine design and the development of novel treatment strategies. The frequency of Hepatitis C virus in the Western Pacific islands was tested in 2013, and the paper, co-authored by Penny, put forward a hypothesis that "genotypes 1 and/or 4 [were] circulating in South Pacific Island people and that these peoples [were] genetically predisposed to be more likely to spontaneous resolve HCV infection than to become chronic carriers". However the researchers suggested that "the prevalence and preponderance of HCV [made] it a global health problem and accurate epidemiological data must underpin any effort to prevent transmission and control the virus".

== Views on the theory of evolution ==
Penny told Kim Hill on RNZ in 2008, any model that couldn't be tested was not of "much use", and a paper he co-authored in 1982 considered claims by Karl Popper that "Darwinism [was] not a testable scientific theory". The study attempted to test the theory of evolution by comparing phylogenetic trees, taking a scientific position presenting a programme that theoretically could refute evolutionary trees even existed. It concluded that because it was a "falsifiable hypothesis", it did meet the criteria for scientific theories and could support the theory of evolution, while not considering the mechanics of evolution. In 1986, Penny and Michael Hendy wrote a chapter in the book The Fascination of Statistics. They reconsidered the assertion by Karl Popper that the theory of evolution could not be tested as a scientific theory because of the difficulties in making predictions about past events, and concluded that "statistics can be used to make tests about unique events that occurred in the past". This debate was to be a continuing theme in Penny's work. He participated in research in 1991 that aimed to determine, without ambiguity, if evolutionary theory could meet Popper's criteria for the demarcation of science. The work found, by comparing trees from the same taxa but from "different data sets", what the writers concluded showed that the theory of a single sequence being sufficient to reconstruct a whole history of life, remained the "Myth of a Universal Tree". In 2003, he co-authored a paper that acknowledged proving the theory of evolution posed difficulties, but noted, "the issues surrounding the testability of evolutionary theory are solvable by better science...[seldom with]...one definitive test...[more likely with]..specific tests to lead to testable predictions".

Penny said that what has become known as the tree of life, is biblical in origin and not a phrase first used by Darwin, although he did describe it as a 'useful simile'. Penny contended that instead of using the tree of life concept, Darwin referred to his theory as 'descent with modification', which may have included the idea of an evolutionary tree but was technically more about cycles resulting from "hybridisation, endosymbiotic gene transfer, lateral gene transfer, recombination, lineage sorting, the complexities of genealogical relationships...[emphasising, for example]...the continuity between populations, subspecies, and sibling species".

== Associations ==
Penny was the president of the New Zealand Association of Scientists between 1989 and 1991.

== Death ==
Penny died in Palmerston North on 20 May 2024, at the age of 85.

== Honours and awards ==
In 1990, Penny was elected a Fellow of the Royal Society of New Zealand. He was awarded the Marsden Medal in 2000, for outstanding service to science in New Zealand and internationally where he had extensive recognition and networks of collaborators, being acknowledged for "Associate Fellowships at Merton College, Oxford, and Darwin College Cambridge and as Past President of the Society for Molecular Biology and Evolution".

In 2004, Penny received the Rutherford Medal for contributions to theoretical biology, molecular evolution and the analysis of DNA.

Penny was appointed a Companion of the New Zealand Order of Merit in the 2006 New Year Honours, for services to science. The 2007 annual report of the Institute of Molecular Biosciences noted that this award recognised "those persons who in any field of endeavour, have rendered meritorious service to the Crown and nation or who have become distinguished by their eminence, talents, contributions or other merits".

In 2018, Penny became the third New Zealander to be named a National Academy of Sciences foreign associate.

Penny's contributions to science have been widely acknowledged by academic contemporaries. Peter Lockhart from Massey University said that Penny had made a "lifelong and lasting contribution to the study of molecular evolution...[and]...his work is characterised by great curiosity, intuition and a capacity to cross disciplines. In particular he has repeatedly demonstrated an uncanny ability to recognise innovative solutions to problems and to see proofs that mathematicians would eventually discover". Mike Steel, of the University of Canterbury, wrote in a tribute article in the New Zealand Science Review in 2009, that "Penny's formula [remained] the most remarkable closed-form expression for any class of phylogenetic trees in evolutionary biology".

== Further publications ==
- Evolution Now (2017). This book by Penny has been described as "presenting an historical view of evolution...[calling for]...a 'true respect' for scientific knowledge". Another reviewer began by noting Penny as a "doyen of New Zealand science, an internationally recognised, highly awarded and highly cited, theoretical and molecular biologist who has had a life-long fascination with evolution". The review concluded that the book was an "enlightening and entertaining tour through the thinking of one of New Zealand's great evolutionary scientists....[and]...lays out key steps along the path to our modern understanding of evolution, looks at some big picture stories that are emerging in the field and identifies major questions that remain".
- Cooperation and selfishness both occur during molecular evolution (2014). This article by Penny challenged the notion of a 'selfish gene' in evolutionary theory and made the case that "at the macromolecular level of genes and proteins the cooperative aspect of evolution [was] more obvious...[because]...thousands of proteins must function together in an integrated manner to use and to produce the many molecules necessary for a functioning cell". In his review of the article, Bill Martin from the University of Duesseldorf, Germany said that while Penny's conclusions were "not new...the essay [was] a worthwhile contribution to the record". Another reviewer, Anthony Poole, University of Canterbury, said the manuscript was a timely update and rethink of the idea. He suggested further points for discussion included examining work done that showed "cooperativity can happen at a higher level even if there [was] competition between individuals at a lower level" and how compartmentalisation can avoid falling into ascribing agency. Penny responded and agreed with expanding the discussion, and noted that some of the examples given by Poole showing interactions between organisms were useful.
- Our Relative Genetics (2004). Penny wrote this journal article as a discussion of research that had been done by others into whether the genomic sequence of the chimpanzee could provide information about how the genetic constitution of people may have arisen as microevolution with a focus on the actual genes rather than gene regulation. He concluded that if there was a "genetic continuum between us and our ancestors and the great apes...[then]...these processes [were] genetically sufficient to fully account for human uniqueness — and that would be my candidate for the top scientific problem solved in the first decade of the new millennium".
