= Mir-3 microRNA precursor family =

Type of RNA

mir-3

Identifiers
- Symbol: mir-3
- Rfam: RF00716
- miRBase family: 3

Other data
- RNA type: microRNA
- Domain: Eukaryota;
- PDB structures: PDBe

In molecular biology mir-3 microRNA is a short RNA molecule. MicroRNAs function to regulate the expression levels of other genes by several mechanisms.

== See also ==
- MicroRNA
