= Molecular Biology and Evolution =

- Discipline: Evolutionary biology
- Language: English
- Edited by: Claudia Russo & Brandon Gaut

Publication details
- History: 1983–present
- Publisher: Oxford University Press on behalf of the Society for Molecular Biology and Evolution
- Frequency: Monthly
- Open access: Yes (2021+)
- Impact factor: 11.000 (2023)

Standard abbreviations
- ISO 4: Mol. Biol. Evol.

Indexing
- CODEN: MBEVEO
- ISSN: 0737-4038 (print); 1537-1719 (web)
- LCCN: 90648368
- OCLC no.: 439813139

Links
- Journal homepage; Online access

Molecular Biology and Evolution (MBE) is a monthly peer-reviewed scientific journal published by Oxford University Press on behalf of the Society for Molecular Biology and Evolution. It publishes work in the intersection of molecular biology and evolutionary biology. The founding editors were Walter Fitch and Masatoshi Nei; the present editors-in-chief are Brandon Gaut and Claudia Russo.

== Subject matter ==
Evolution is the most fundamental of biological processes. MBE publishes patterns and processes that impact the evolution of life at molecular levels, across a full breadth of taxonomy, genomic organization, and functions, forms, and phenotypes. MBE's Methods, Resource, and Protocol sections include research tools that enable discoveries, while the Reviews and Perspectives synthesize different aspects of the evolutionary thought.

== Editorial process ==
All MBE manuscripts are peer-reviewed. Decisions to publish are made by the Board of Editors, led by the Editors-in-Chief (EiCs) that oversee processing and set the direction of the journal. The board also includes Associate Editors (AEs) who solicit peer reviews and make an initial recommendation and the Senior Editors (SEs) who make the final recommendation that lead to the decision for each manuscript.

== Management ==
MBE is entirely owned by The Society for Molecular Biology and Evolution (SMBE). The SMBE Council appoints the Editor-in-Chief. The Journal is published by Oxford University Press. MBE has transitioned to full Open Access, with all papers free to access from 1 January 2021. All articles accepted for publication from 1 August 2020 have been published as Open Access.

== Impact ==
According to the Journal Citation Reports, the journal has a 2017 Impact Factor of 10.217, a 2018 Impact Factor of 14.797, a 2019 Impact Factor of 11.062, a 2022 Impact Factor of 10.700, a 2023 Impact Factor of 11.00, and a 2024 Impact Factor of 5.3. In 2023, MBE was ranked 8th out of the 172 journals in the Genetics & Heredity category, 16th out of 285 journals within the Biochemistry & Molecular Biology category and 4th out of 54 in the Evolutionary Biology category.
