= List of Swiss inventions and discoveries =

The following list is composed of items, techniques and processes that were invented by or discovered by people from Switzerland.

== Astronomy ==
- First exoplanet orbiting a solar-type star discovered by Swiss astronomers Didier Queloz and Michel Mayor in 1995 (51 Pegasi b), Nobel-prize laureates in Physics in 2019
- Earliest estimation of the "radiation of the stars” in his 1896 article "La Température de L'Espace" by Charles Édouard Guillaume

== Biology ==
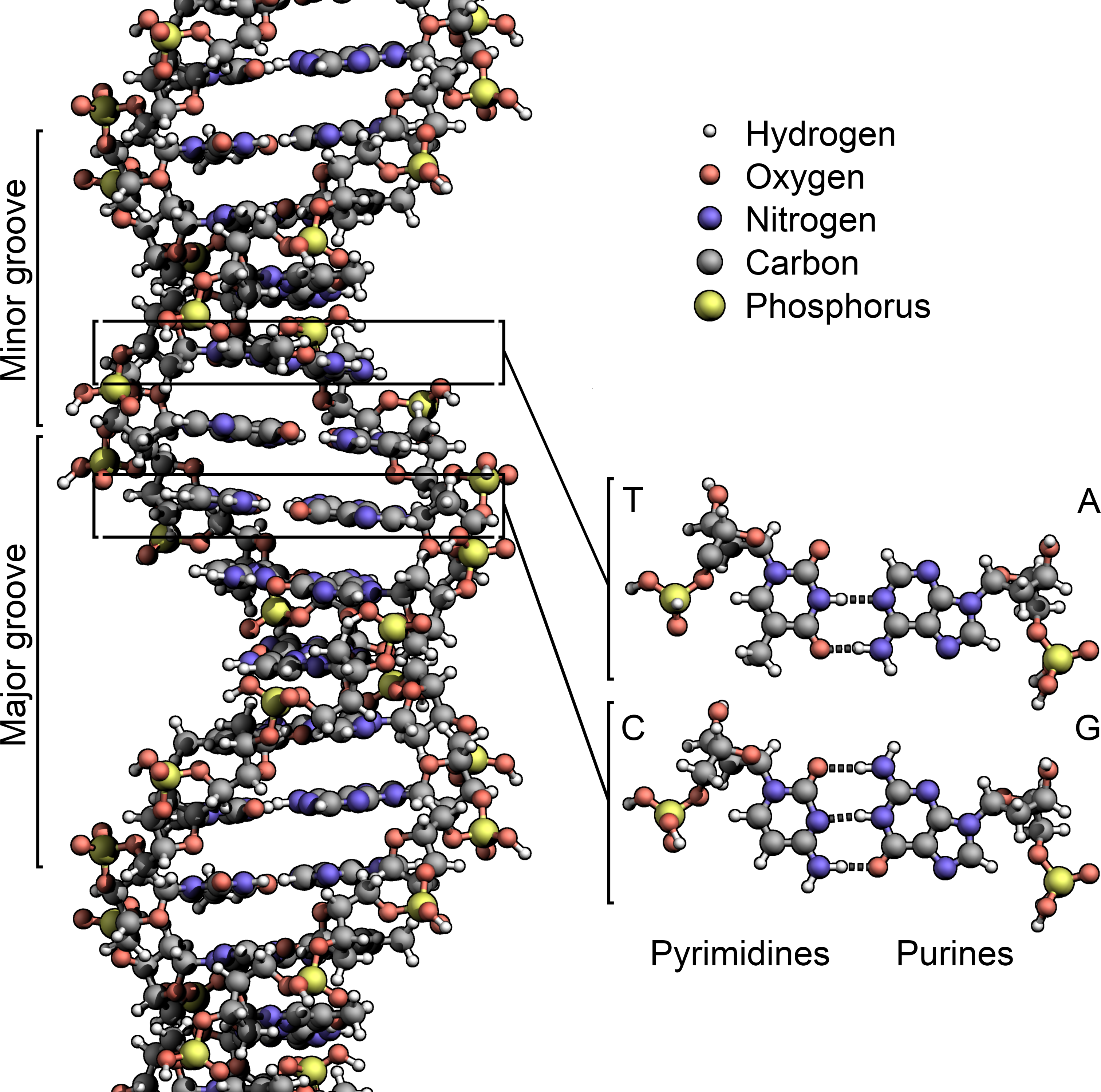
DNA structure

- Nucleic acid, DNA by Friedrich Miescher (1868)
- Restriction endonuclease by Werner Arber
- Research of the Immune system by Rolf M. Zinkernagel

== Chemistry ==
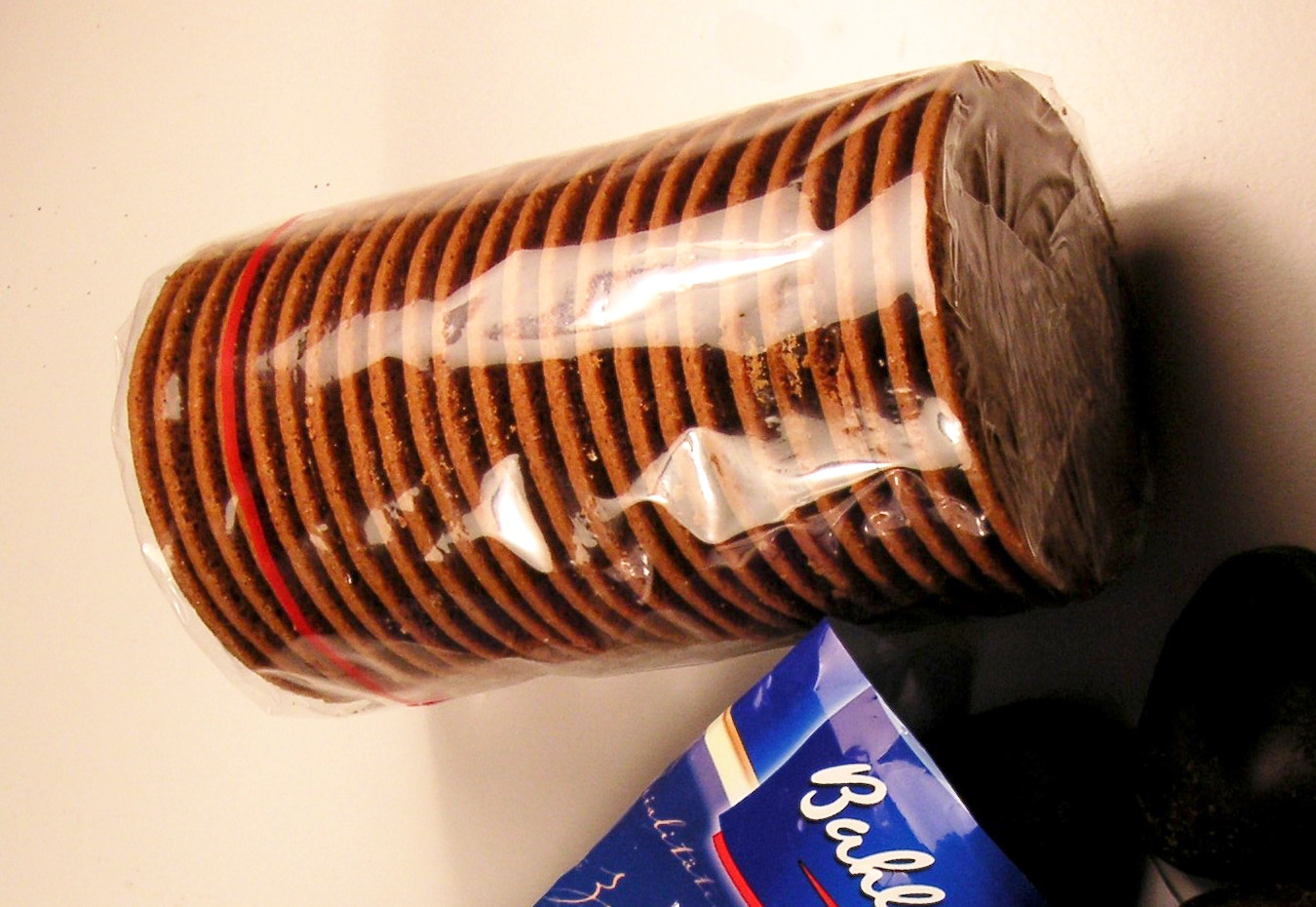
Cellophane bag

- Laudanum by Paracelsus
- Aluminium foil by Robert Victor Neher
- Cellophane by Jacques E. Brandenberger
- DDT by Paul Hermann Müller
- Lysergic acid diethylamide (LSD) by Albert Hofmann
- Nickel–steel alloys he named invar, elinvar and platinite [it] by Charles Édouard Guillaume
- Reichstein process by Tadeus Reichstein
- Glyphosate by Henri Martin
- Sandmeyer reaction by Traugott Sandmeyer

== Clothes and Fashion ==
- Velcro by George de Mestral
- Coil Zip fastening invented by Martin Winterhalter

== Computing ==
- Computer mouse:
  - First computer mouse by René Sommer, co-inventor
  - First laser mouse (2004)
- Pascal programming language by Niklaus Wirth
- Smaky by Jean-Daniel Nicoud
- World Wide Web at CERN

== Construction ==
=== Construction materials and engineering solutions ===
- Structural steel reinforced concrete revolution by Robert Maillart at ETH Zurich
  - three-hinged arch
  - deck-stiffened arch for bridges
  - beamless floor slab
  - mushroom ceiling for industrial buildings
- Tunnel waterproofing by Sika

=== Construction machines ===
- Walking excavator by Ernst Menzi, 1966 (Menzi Muck)
- Walo Asphalt Core Finishers for Dense Asphaltic Concrete (DAC) core for embankment dams.
- Walo Steep-Slope Winch-Stabilised Pavres, for the lining of water reservoirs and canals.
- Walo ultra.high performance concrete machinery and formulas for bridge rehabilitation and structural reinforcements.
- BRC pile head milling machine
- Marti Gründungstechnik AG, SMARTEX full displacement pile
- Marti Tunnel AG Hybrid Dual-Fluid Injection Shields

=== Power tools: ===
- Jigsaw: developed by Albert Kaufmann, an engineer of Scintilla AG company in Solothurn.

=== Railway construction and maintenance ===
- Ballast cleaner invented by Charles-Auguste Scheuchzer
- Tamping machine invented by Charles-Auguste Scheuchzer
- Rail weeder, invented by Charles-Auguste Scheuchzer

== Cuisine ==
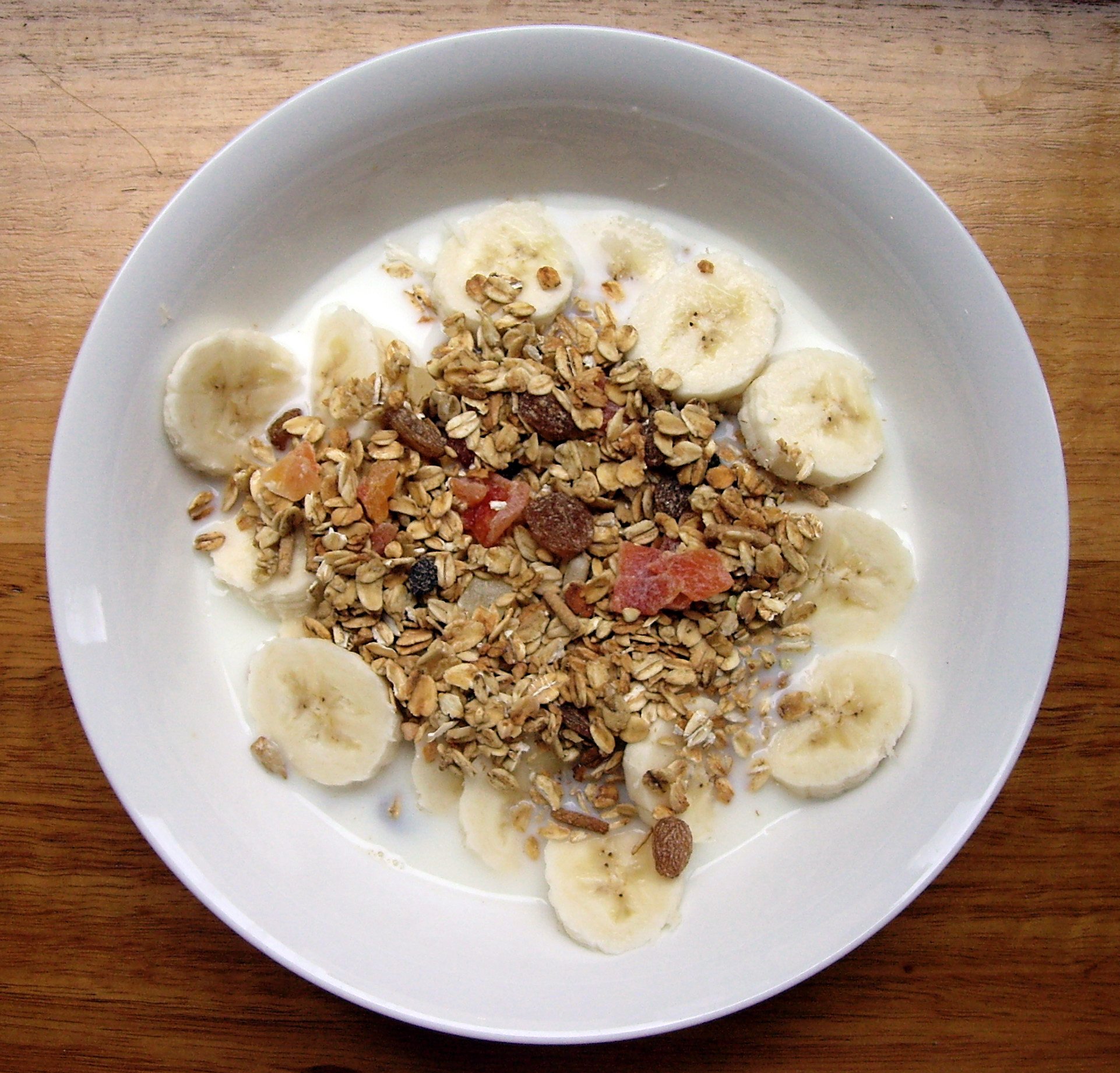
Dry muesli mix, served with milk

- Absinthe
- Älplermagronen
- Aromat
- Bündnernusstorte
- Cheeses and cheese recipes
  - Fondue
  - Gruyère
  - Raclette
  - Sbrinz, the ancestor of the Parmiggiano Reggiano and the Pecorino romano
- Chocolates:
  - Conching by Rudolf Lindt
  - Hazelnut chocolate by Charles-Amédée Kohler
  - Milk chocolate by Daniel Peter (disputed) (Note: Jordan & Timaeus claims to have created milk chocolate using donkey milk in 1839 in Dresden)
  - White chocolate by Nestlé And his Partner
- Coffee
  - Capsule
  - Instant coffee by Max Morgenthaler
- Meringues
- Milk powder
- Muesli by Maximilian Bircher-Benner
- Rösti
- Stock cubes
- Tools:
  - Immersion blender by Roger Perrinjaquet
  - Rex vegetable peeler by Alfred Neweczerzal
- Zürcher Geschnetzeltes

== Economics ==
- Discovery of economic cycles and propagation of Social policy against the classic liberal economy by Simonde de Sismondi
- Bank secrecy

== Mathematics ==
=== Leonhard Euler ===
Leonhard Euler's work:

- Mathematical notations that he introduced:
  - Concept of a function (first to write f(x) to denote the function f applied to the argument x)
  - Letter Σ for summations
  - Letter i to denote the imaginary unit
  - Modern notation for the trigonometric functions
  - Natural logarithm (now also known as Euler's number)
- Differential equations
- Defined logarithms for negative and complex numbers
- Defined the exponential function for complex numbers and discovered its relation to the trigonometric functions
- Development of power series, the expression of functions as sums of infinitely many terms
- Euler–Bernoulli beam equation, a cornerstone of engineering
- Euler's critical load, the critical buckling load of an ideal strut
- Euler equations in Fluid dynamics
- Euler's formula
  $$e^{i\varphi} = \cos \varphi + i\sin \varphi$$
- Euler's identity
  $$e^{i \pi} +1 = 0$$
- Introduction of exponential function and logarithms in analytic proofs
- Predicted the phenomenon of cavitation in 1754 before observing it
- Solution to the Basel problem (1735)

=== Bernoulli family ===
==== Jacob Bernoulli (1655–1705) ====
Jacob Bernoulli's work:

- Ars Conjectandi published in Basel in 1713, theory of probability from which resulted the Bernoulli trial.
- Bernoulli numbers
- Bernoulli differential equation solved y

$y' = p(x)y + q(x)y^n.$

- Discovery of the constant e by studying a question about compound interest

$\lim_{n\to\infty} \left( 1 + \frac{1}{n} \right)^n$

- Introduces the term integral in calculus
- Lemniscate of Bernoulli
- Solution of differential equation by separation of variables

==== Nicolaus I Bernoulli (1687-1759) ====
Nicolaus I Bernoulli's s contributions:

- Orthogonal trajectories
- Probability and statistics research with the St. Petersburg Paradox

==== Nicolaus II Bernoulli (1695-1726) ====
Nicolaus II Bernoulli's contribution:

- He posed the problem of reciprocal orthogonal trajectories

==== Daniel Bernoulli (1700–1782) ====
Daniel Bernoulli's contributions:

- Bernoulli's principle is of critical use in aerodynamics.
- Expected utility theory
- He laid the basis for the kinetic theory of gases, and applied the idea to explain Boyle's law (Hydrodynamica 1738).
- He worked with Euler on elasticity and the development of the Euler–Bernoulli beam equation.
- Principle of superposition was first stated by Daniel Bernoulli in 1753 ("The general motion of a vibrating system is given by a superposition of its proper vibrations")

=== Gabriel Cramer ===
Gabriel Cramer's contributions

- Cramer's theorem (algebraic curves)
- In 1750 he published Cramer's rule, giving a general formula for the solution for any unknown in a linear equation system having a unique solution, in terms of determinants implied by the system. This rule is still standard.]

=== Others ===
- Planimeter by Jakob Amsler-Laffon.

== Medicine ==
- Artificial hip joint (Sulzer joint, by Maurice Edmond Müller)
- Diazepam (Valium) (1958, company Hoffmann-La Roche)
- Diclofenac (Voltaren) (1973, company Ciba-Geigy)
- Hydro-alcoholic gel (1995, Didier Pittet)
- Hydrogel skin cancer treatment (2022, University of Bern)
- Laudanum by Paracelsus
- Panthenol (Bepanthen) (1944, company Roche)
- Stent (1986, Medinvent, Hans Wallsten)
- Theodor Kocher
  - Anesthesia
    - Masks to deliver chloroform-ether narcosis
  - Surgical methodology
    - Hygiene rules
    - Techniques of sterilisation
    - Surgical records quantifying and analysing success and failures
  - Surgical procedures
    - Pre-operative preparation of patients to receive anaesthesia to avoid aspiration of gastric content
    - Reduction technique for shoulder dislocation
    - Thiroidectomy
  - Surgical tools
    - Artery clamp
    - Bowel clamp
    - Craniometer
    - Kidney holding forceps
    - Scissors chisels and files

== Military ==
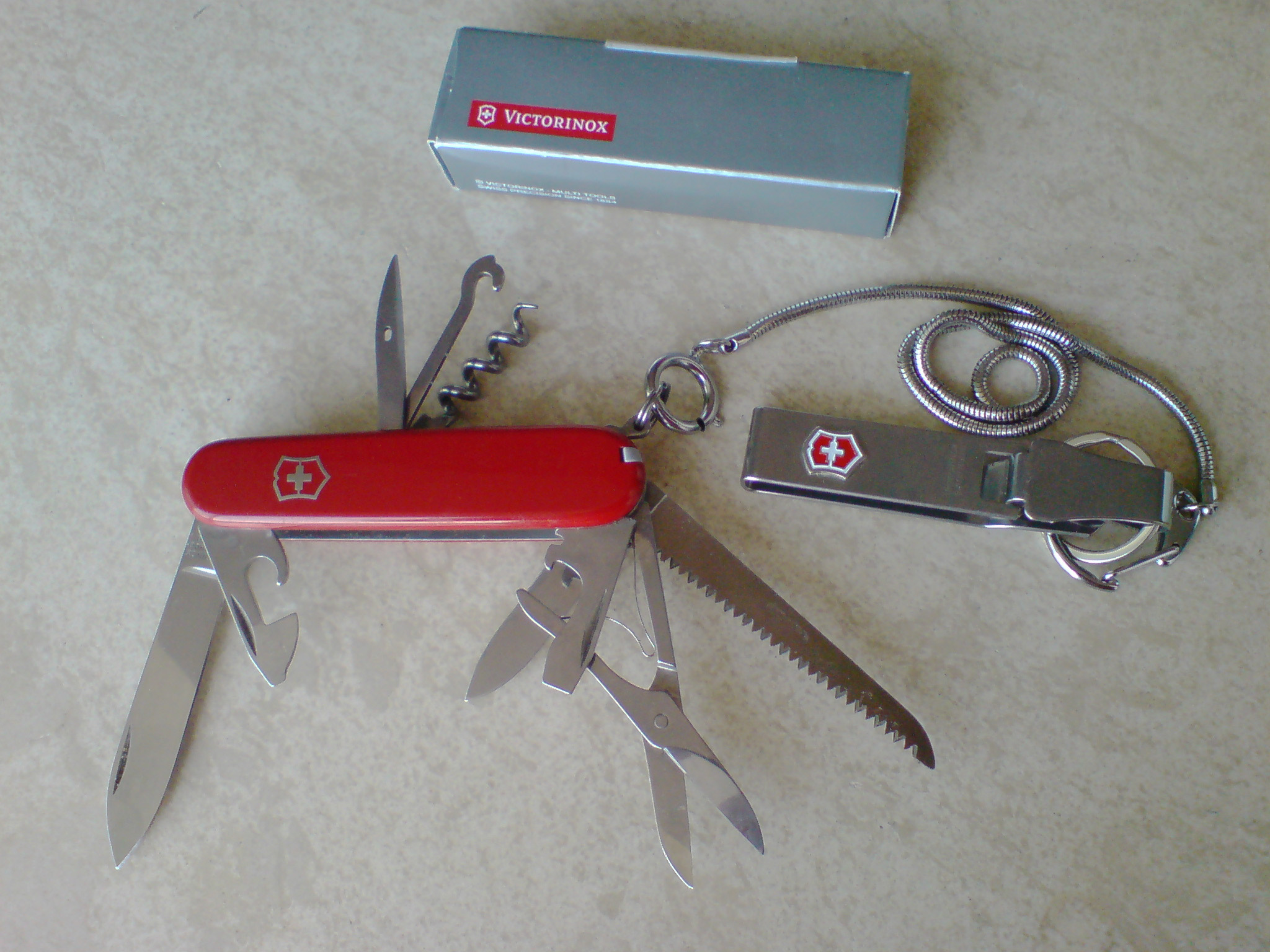
Victorinox "Huntsman" Swiss Army knife

- Swiss Army knife
- Full Metal Jacket bullet by Eduard Rubin
- Milliradian by Charles-Marc Dapples

== Physics ==
- Argand lamp by Aimé Argand
- Twisted nematic field effect by Hoffmann-La Roche
- Scanning tunneling microscope by Heinrich Rohrer (co-inventor with German Gerd Binnig)
- Super-twisted nematic display by Brown, Boveri & Cie
- Swatch Internet Time by Swatch
- Research on Nuclear Magnetic Resonance by Kurt Wüthrich

== Sports ==
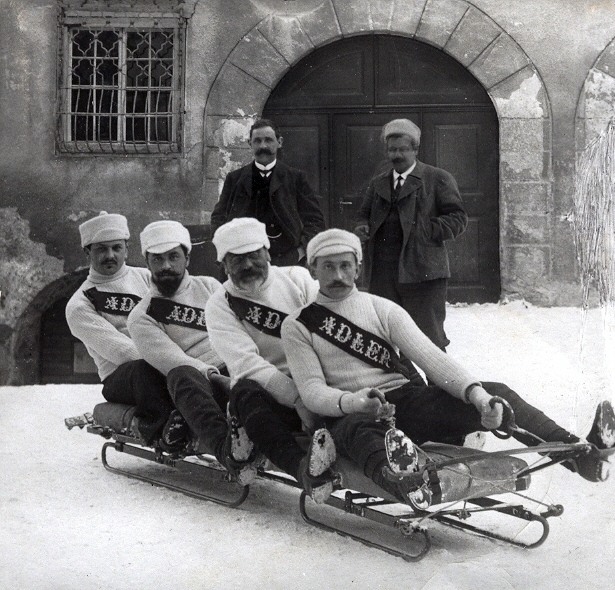
The Swiss bobsleigh team from Davos, ca. 1910

- Bobsleigh tracks
- Schwingen
- Hornussen

== Technology ==
- Basic oxygen steelmaking by Robert Durrer in 1948
- Electricity production and transmission:
  - Transmission of electrical energy using high-voltage three-phase current developed by Brown, Boveri & Cie for the International Electrotechnical Exhibition
  - Research on steam and gas turbines developed at ETH Zurich with Aurel Stodola
    - Law of the Ellipse
    - First gas turbine electric generator in collaboration with Brown, Boveri & Cie
    - Aurel Stodola constructs a closed-loop heat pump in 1928 (water source from Lake Geneva) which provides heating for the Geneva city hall to this day.
- Electric kilns invented by Brown, Boveri & Cie
- Electric toothbrush, the Broxodent by Dr. Philippe Guy Woog
- Gearless cement drive developed by Brown, Boveri & Cie in 1969
- Hydrogen-based Internal combustion engine ignited by sparks invented in 1806 by François Isaac de Rivaz.
- LCD projector at Brown Boveri & Cie
- Precision valve steam engine (Sulzer, 1876)
- Shuttle-less loom (Sulzer, 1876)
- Ski lifts
- Chronometry / watches:
  - Constant escapement by Girard-Perregaux
  - Cross-beat escapement and remontoire for watches by Jost Bürgi
  - Quartz watches (Centre électronique horloger)
  - Tourbillon by Abraham-Louis Breguet
  - Charles Édouard Guillaume's Guillaume balance (a type of balance wheel)

=== Machines ===
- Packaging machines:
  - Autoplatine die-cutter by Bobst (1940)
  - Rotary Braille Press by Bobst (1915)
- Precision machinery:
  - Swiss-turn lathe
  - Thread whirling by Tornos in the 1990s
  - Cam multispindle machine with the Tornos AS 14 (1958)
  - CNC multispindle machine (Tornos CNC 632, 1988)

== Transportation ==
=== Air ===
- Solar Impulse by Bertrand Piccard in co-operation with EPFL

=== Naval ===
- Azipod, first azimuth thruster with the motor located in the pod itself (by ABB Group)
- Bathyscaphe Trieste by Auguste Piccard

=== Rail ===
- Articulated locomotive by Anatole Mallet
- Diesel electric locomotive traction control by Hermann Lemp
- High-speed locomotive with drive shafts fitted exclusively in bogies developed by Brown, Boveri & Cie in 1944
- Riggenbach rack system by Niklaus Riggenbach
- Locher Rack System
- Diesel-Sulzer-Klose GmbH, first train to run with a mechanical diesel power in 1912.

=== Road ===
- Turbocharger by Alfred Büchi

== Miscellaneous ==
- The Red Cross by Henry Dunant
- Helvetica Typeface by Max Miedinger
- World Health Organization

== See also ==
List of Swiss inventors and discoverers
