= List of Swiss inventors and discoverers =

This is a list of Swiss inventors and discoverers. The following list comprises people from Switzerland, and also people of predominantly Swiss heritage, in alphabetical order of the surname.

Existing:	A	B	C	D	E	F	G	H	I	J	Q	R	S	T	U	V	W	X	Y	Z
See also						Notes						References						External links

== A ==
- Carl Roman Abt inventor of Abt rack system
- Werner Arber, (nobel prize) discovered restriction endonucleases. Their work would lead to the development of recombinant DNA technology.
- Aimé Argand, inventor of Argand lamp.

== B ==
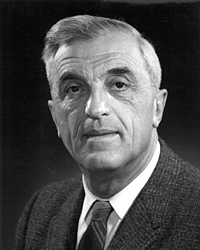
Felix Bloch.

- Maximilian Bircher-Benner, invented modern muesli
- Felix Bloch, (nobel prize) discovered Bloch equations
- Johann Georg Bodmer
- Daniel Bovet (nobel prize), discovered drugs that block the actions of specific neurotransmitters. He is best known for his discovery in 1937 of antihistamines, which block the neurotransmitter histamine and are used in allergy medication.
- Jacques E. Brandenberger, inventor of cellophane

== D ==
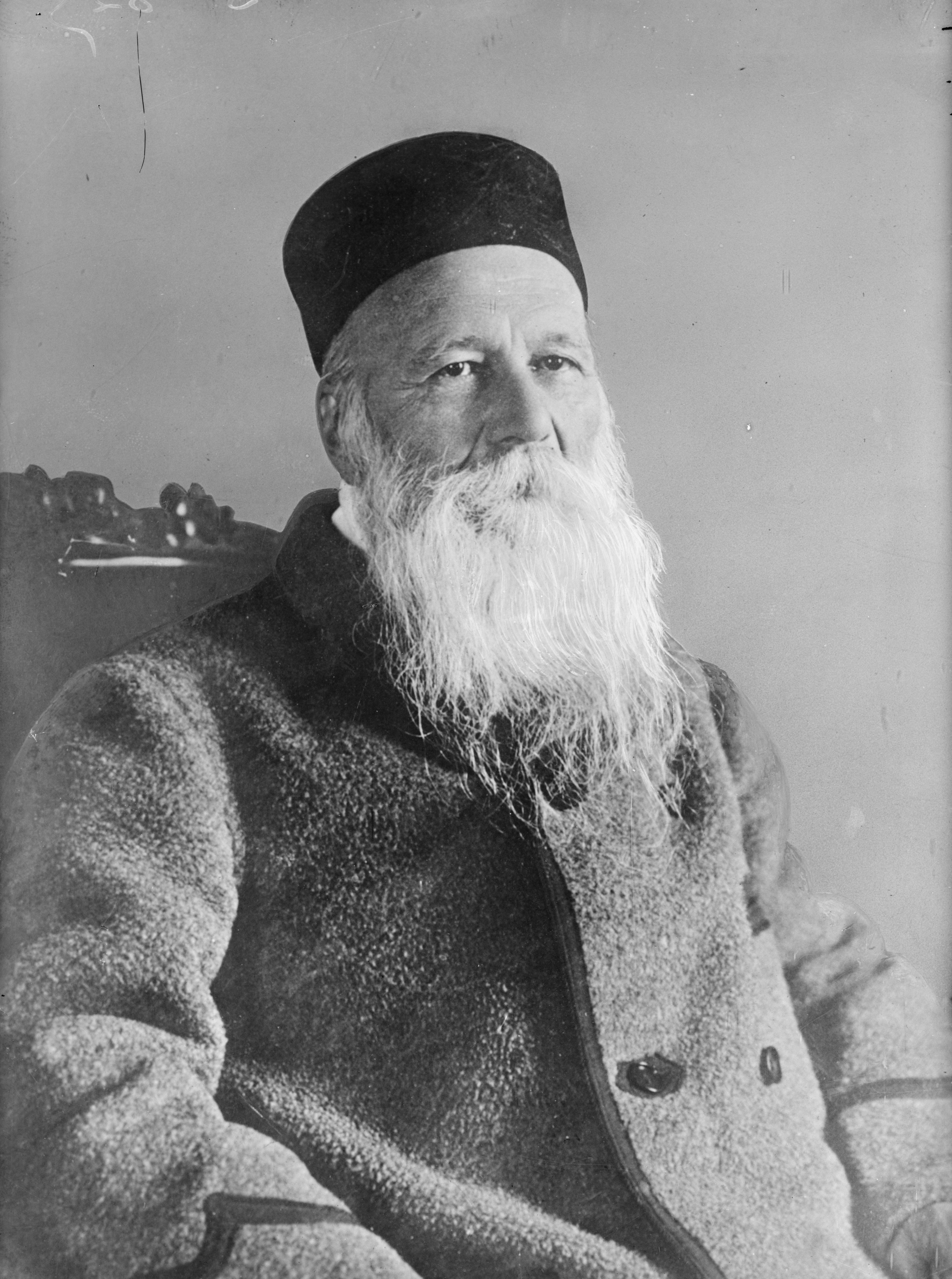
Henry Dunant, in 1901

- Henry Dunant, (nobel prize), inventor of The Red Cross. He shared the Nobel Peace Prize in 1901 with Frédéric Passy, famous French Peace activist.
- Jacques Dubochet (chemistry nobel prize 2017), bio-physicist, received a nobel for his work on the development of cryogenic electron microscopy for the high-resolution structure determination of bio-molecules in solution. In 2020, the developments in the field helped to support the fight against COVID-19 pandemic. This technology help to study the viral assembly and replication processes at a molecule scale. It enabled to quickly understand the spike protein structure of the SARS-CoV-2 virus.

== E ==
- Richard R. Ernst, contributions towards the development of Fourier transform nuclear magnetic resonance spectroscopy.

== F ==
- Nicolas Fatio de Duillier
- Antoine Favre-Salomon
- Edmond H. Fischer (nobel prize), describing how reversible phosphorylation works as a switch to activate proteins and regulate various cellular processes.

== G ==
- Charles Édouard Guillaume, (nobel prize) discovery of anomalies in nickel steel alloys.
- Gustav Guanella

== H ==
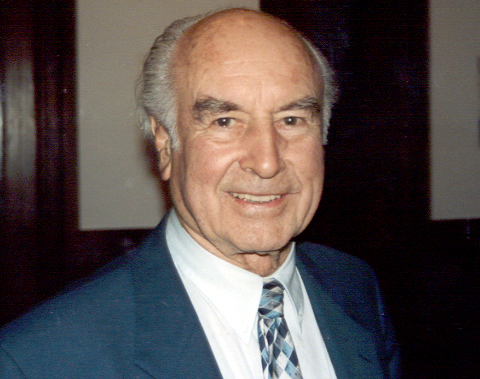
Albert Hofmann.

- Walter Rudolf Hess (nobel prize), mapping the areas of the brain involved in the control of internal organs.
- Wilhelm His, Sr., inventor of microtome
- Albert Hofmann, inventor of LSD

== K ==
- Paul Karrer, (nobel prize), research on vitamins.
- Ursula Keller, developed the first method for generating ultra-fast light pulses known as semiconductor saturable-absorber mirrors (SESAMs)

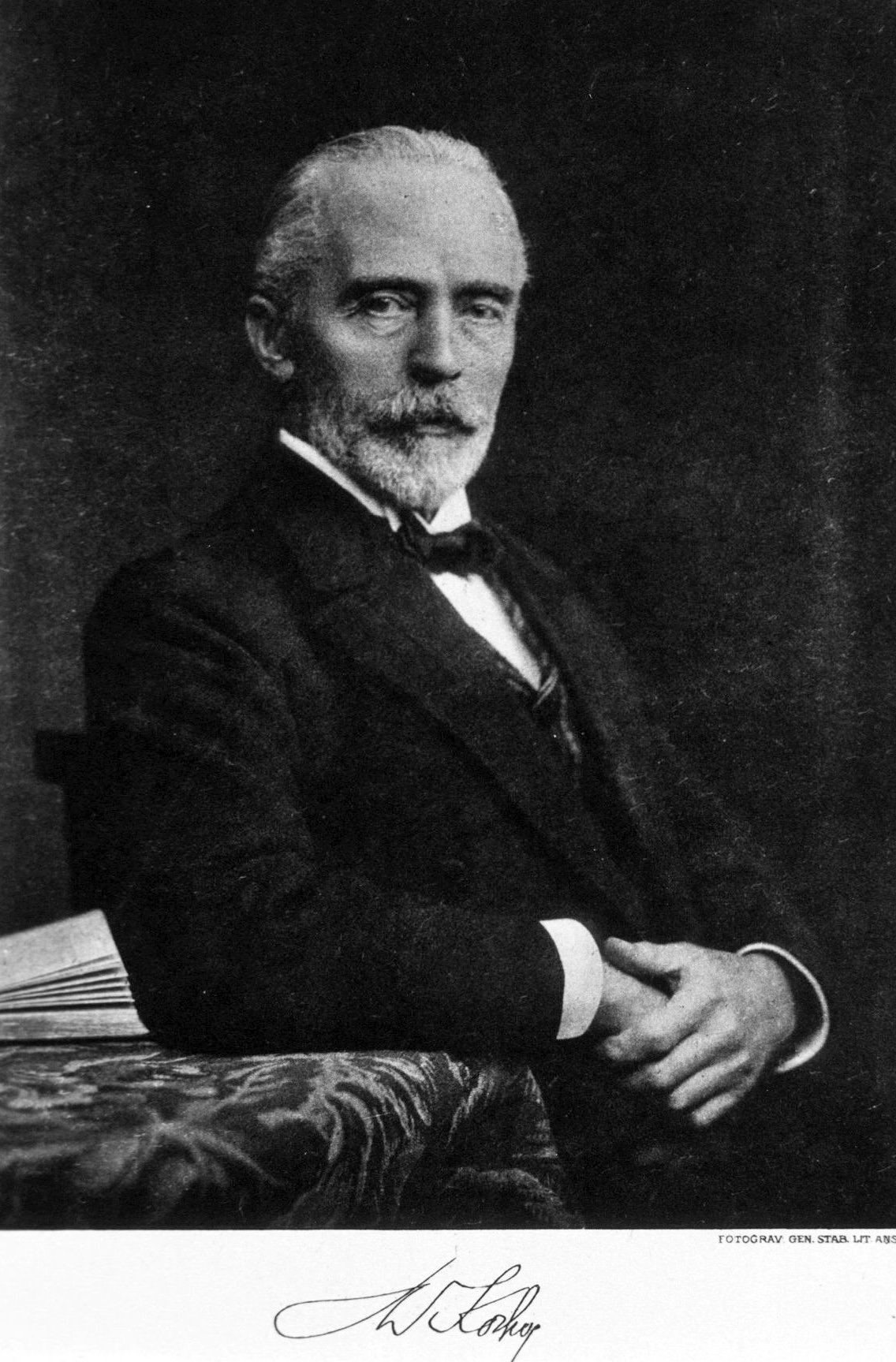
Emil Theodor Kocher.

- Emil Theodor Kocher (nobel prize), worked in the physiology, pathology and surgery of the thyroid.
- Elisabeth Kübler-Ross, a pioneer in near-death studies

== M ==
- Georges de Mestral, inventor of Velcro
- Friedrich Miescher, discovered Nucleic acid, DNA (1868)
- K. Alex Müller

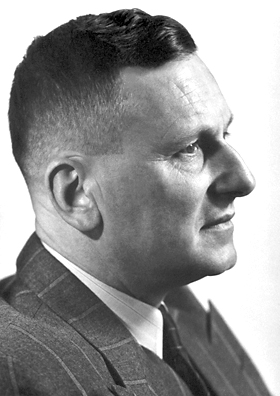
Paul Hermann Müller

- Paul Hermann Müller, discovery of insecticidal qualities and use of DDT in the control of vector diseases such as malaria and yellow fever.

== N ==
- Jean-Daniel Nicoud, inventor of Smaky

== P ==
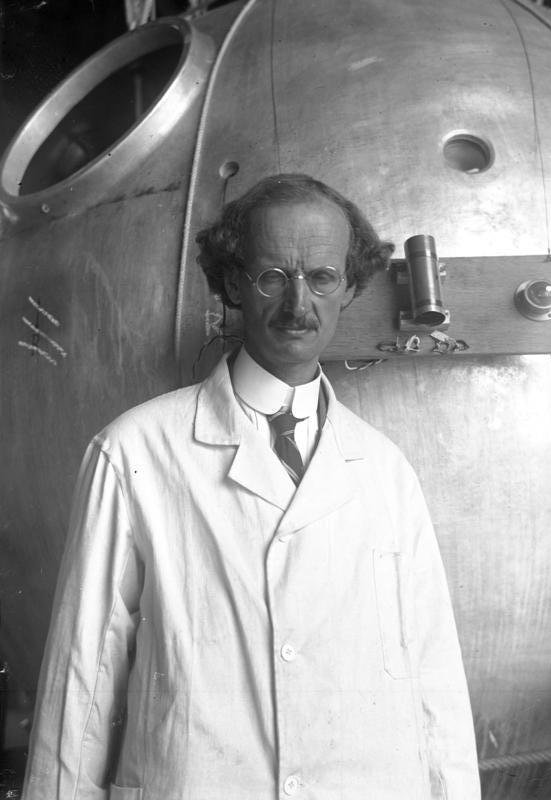
Auguste Piccard.

- Paracelsus, discovered Laudanum
- Jean Samuel Pauly, created the first fully self-contained cartridges
- Roger Perrinjaquet, inventor of the electric immersion blender (Bamix)
- Auguste Piccard, inventor of Bathyscaphe
- Vladimir Prelog (nobel prize), research into the stereochemistry of organic molecules and reaction

== R ==
- Tadeus Reichstein, discovered Reichstein process
- Niklaus Riggenbach, inventor of the Riggenbach track system
- Daisy Roulland-Dussoix, discovered restriction enzymes

== S ==
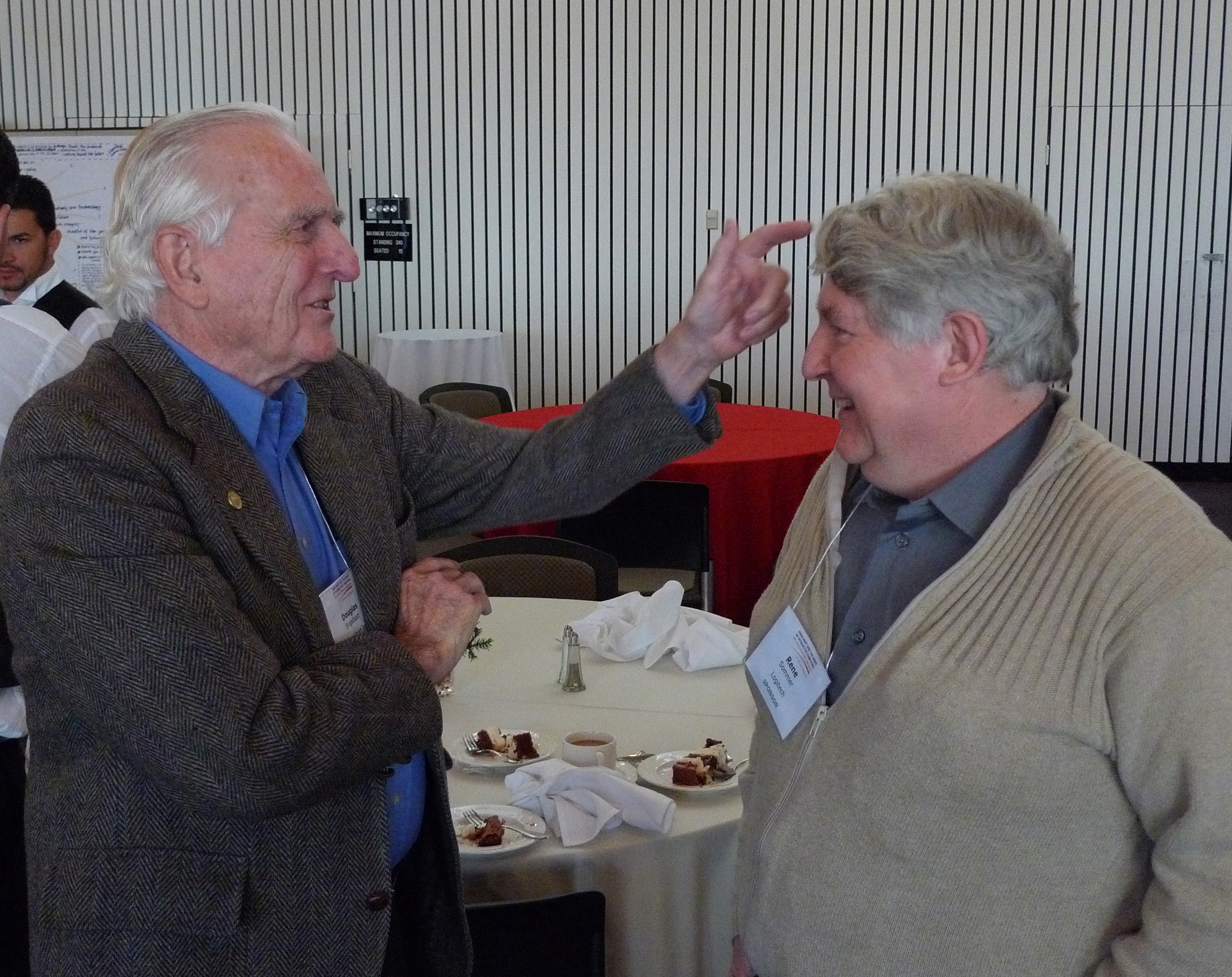
René Sommer (right) with Douglas Engelbart (left).

- Martin Schadt, co-inventor of twisted nematic field effect (TN-effect)
- René Sommer, co-inventor of computer mouse

== T ==
- René Thury

== W ==
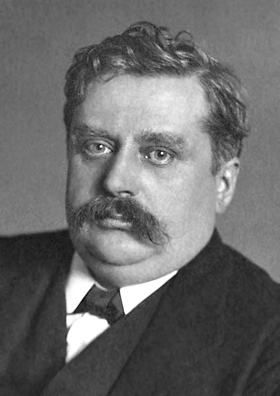
Alfred Werner

- Alfred Werner (nobel prize), proposing the octahedral configuration of transition metal complexes. Werner developed the basis for modern coordination chemistry.
- Niklaus Wirth, inventor of programming language Pascal.

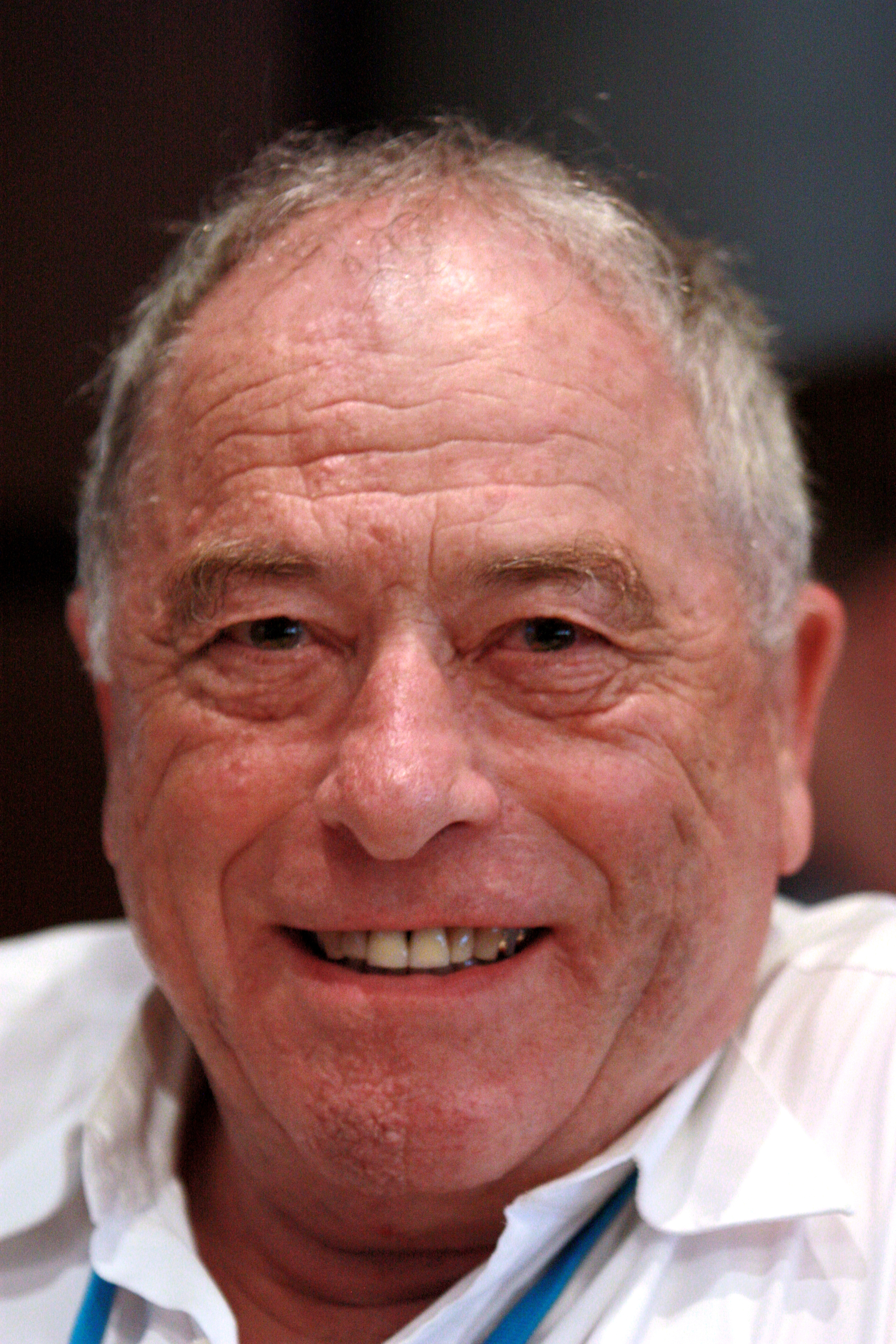
Kurt Wüthrich

- Kurt Wüthrich (nobel prize), developing Nuclear Magnetic Resonance (NMR) methods for studying biological macromolecules.

== Z ==
- Rolf M. Zinkernagel (nobel prize), discovery of how the immune system recognizes virus-infected cells.

== See also ==
- List of Swiss inventions and discoveries
- Swiss people
