= Antoine Favre =

Antoine Favre may refer to:

- Antoine Favre (composer) (c. 1670–c. 1739), French composer and violinist
- Antoine Favre (jurist) (1557–1624) French nobleman and jurist
- Antoine Favre, Swiss judge who served on the Federal Supreme Court of Switzerland from 1952 to 1967
- Antoine Favre, governor of French Guiana in 1864-1865
- Antoine Favre, 18th century artist whose work is featured in the chapel at the Mdina Cathedral Museum
- Antoine Favre-Salomon (1734–1820) Swiss watchmaker
