= Ellipse Law =

Ellipse law could refer to:

- Stodola's cone law for turbines
- Kepler's first law, which states that objects orbiting a larger object move in an ellipse
