= Fent (disambiguation) =

Fent is short for Fentanyl, an opioid drug also used recreationally.

Fent may also refer to:

- FENT, a probe developed by the Laboratory for Energy Conversion
- Lance Baker Fent, guitarist for The Peanut Butter Conspiracy
- Kathleen Fent, wife of internet personality Rob Malda
- Femtanyl, an electronic music duo
