= Music box =

Automatic musical instrument

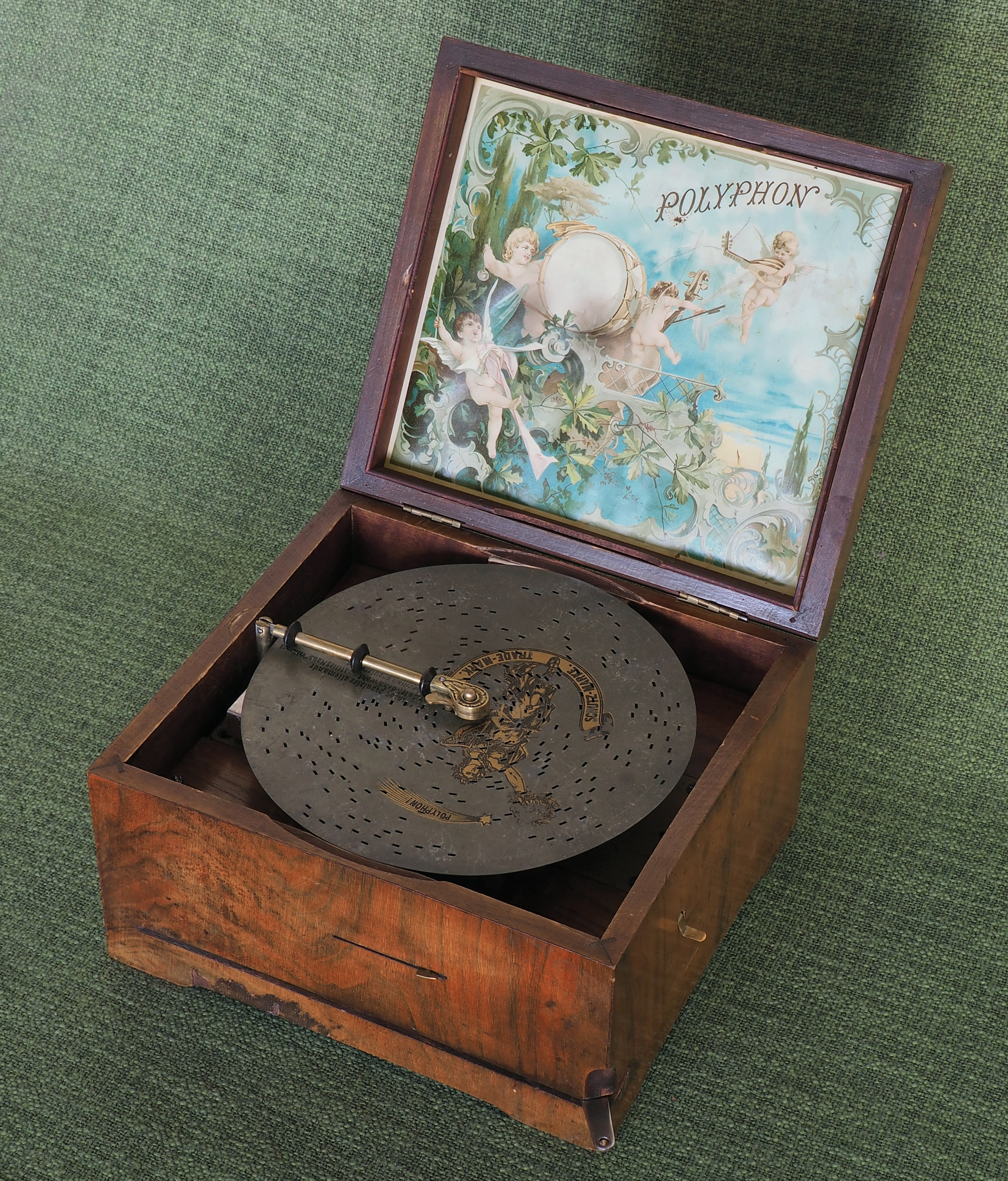
Music box by Polyphon-Musikwerke in Leipzig, Germany

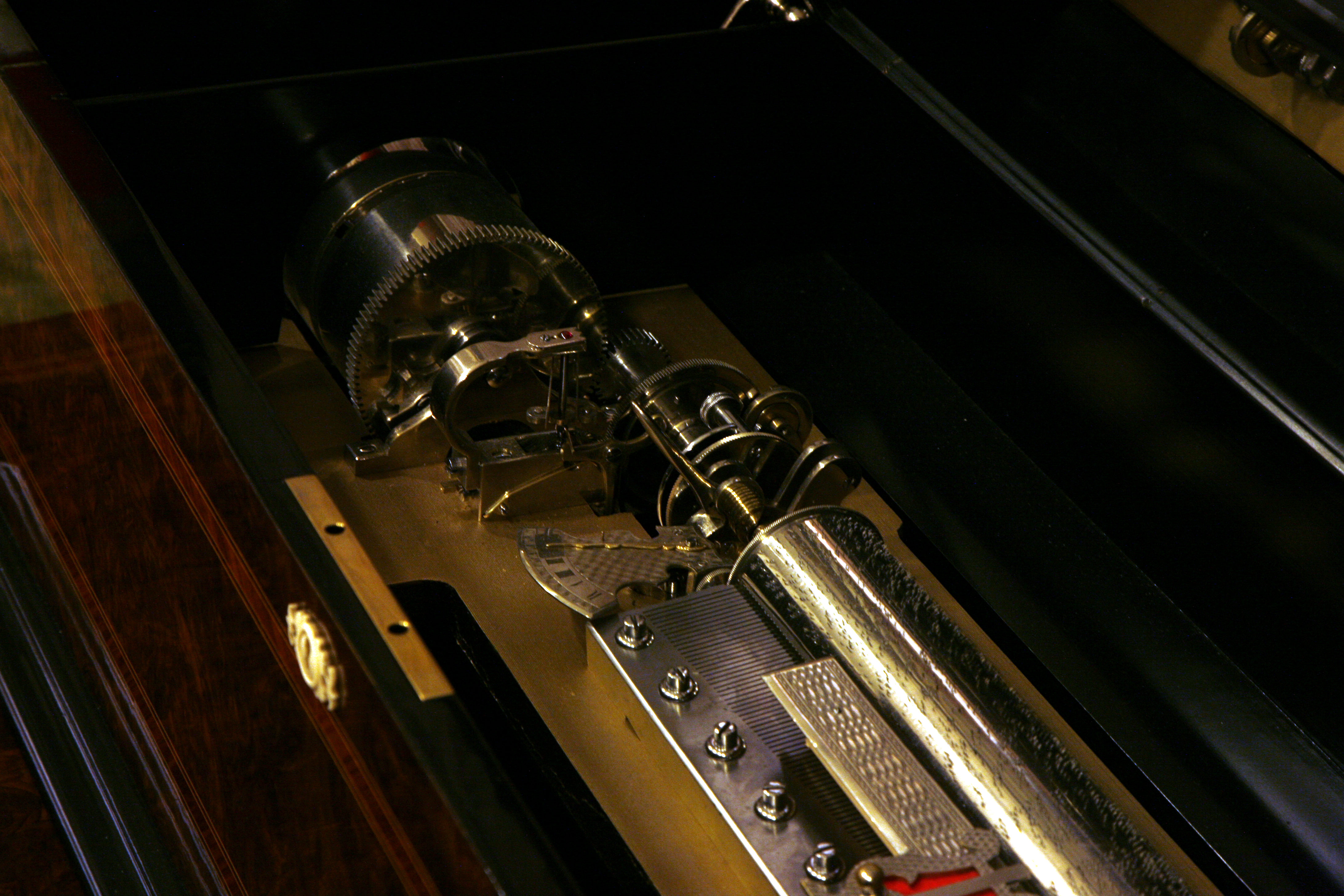
A music box

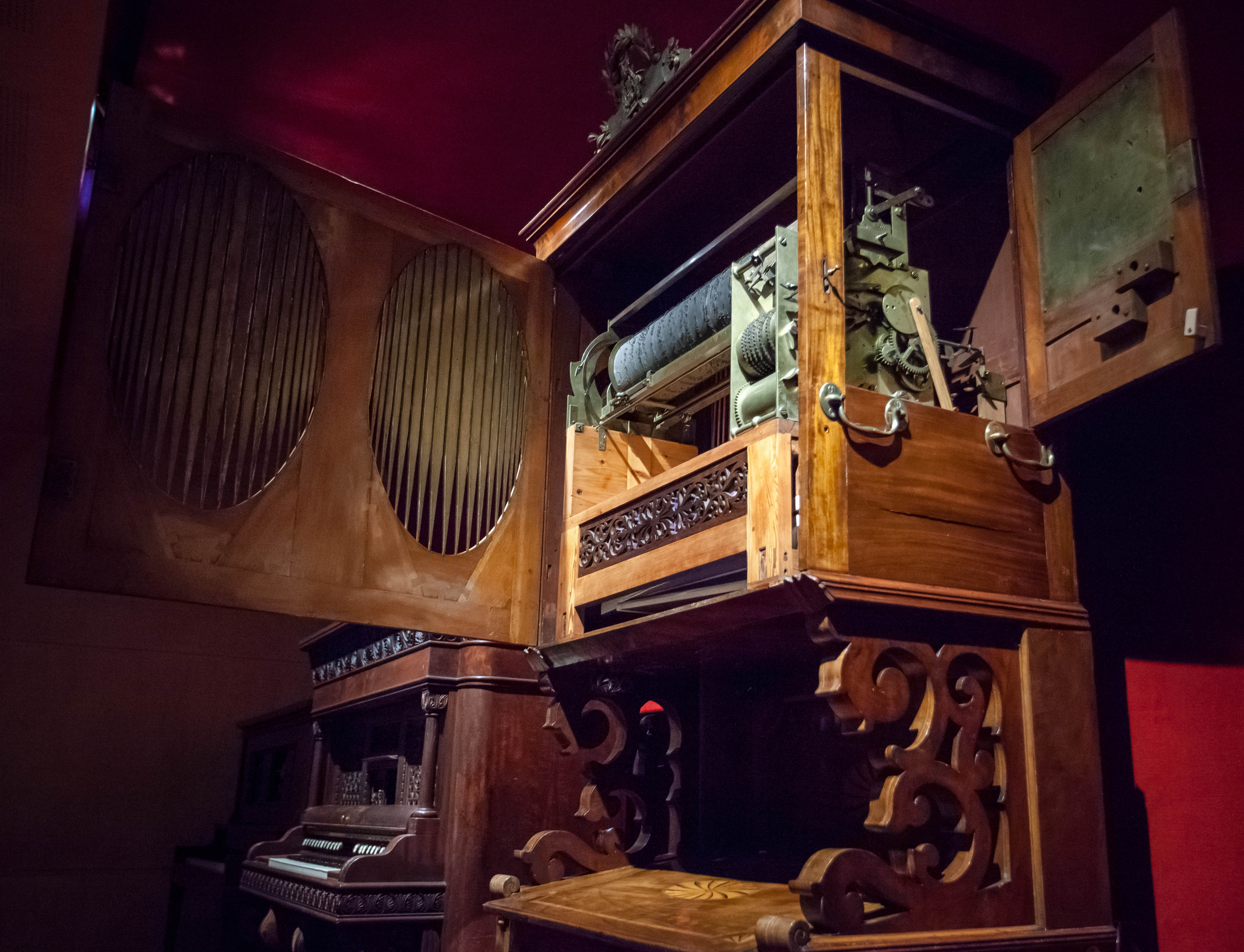
Interior of a large music box at the Museu de la Música de Barcelona in Catalonia

"The Blue Danube" (0:58)
Polyphon metal disc (1890)

A music box (American English) or musical box (British English) is an automatic musical instrument in a box that produces musical notes by using a set of pins placed on a revolving cylinder or disc to pluck the tuned teeth (or lamellae) of a steel comb. The popular device best known today as a "music box" developed from musical snuff boxes of the 18th century and were originally called carillons à musique (French for "chimes of music"). Some of the more complex boxes also contain a tiny drum and/or bells in addition to the metal comb.

== History ==
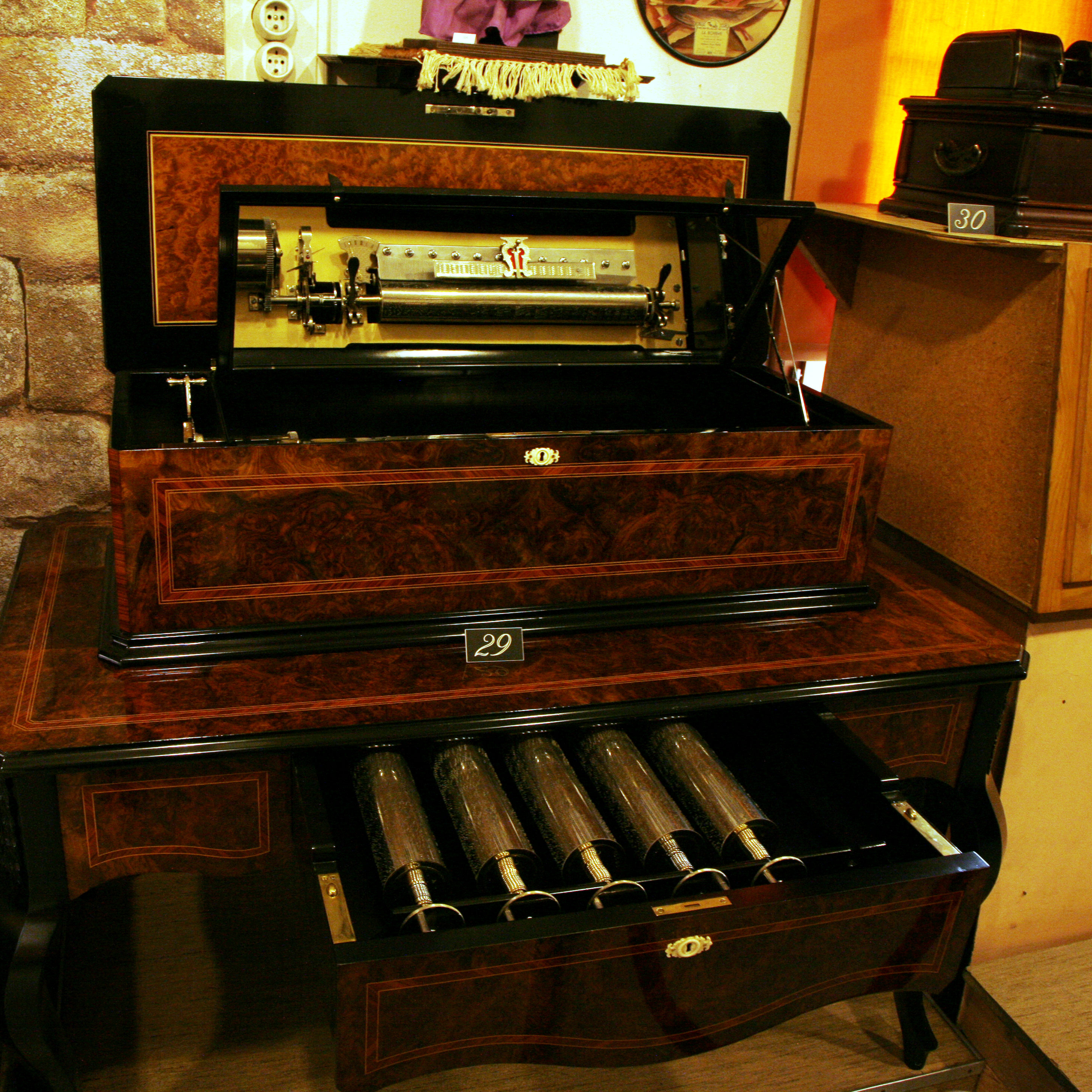
Typical table music box, with six interchangeable cylinders

The Symphonium company started business in 1885 as the first manufacturers of disc-playing music boxes. Two of the founders of the company, Gustave Brachhausen and Paul Riessner, left to set up a new firm, Polyphon, in direct competition with their original business and their third partner, Oscar Paul Lochmann. Following the establishment of the Original Musikwerke Paul Lochmann in 1900, the founding Symphonion business continued until 1909.

According to the Victoria Museums in Australia, "The Symphonion is notable for the enormous diversity of types, styles, and models produced... No other disc-playing musical box exists in so many varieties. The company also pioneered the use of electric motors... the first model fitted with an electric motor being advertised in 1900. The company moved into the piano-orchestrion business and made both disc-operated and barrel-playing models, player-pianos, and phonographs."

Meanwhile, Polyphon expanded to America, where Brachhausen established the Regina Company. Regina was a spectacular success. It eventually reinvented itself as a maker of vacuum cleaners and steam cleaners.

In the heyday of the music box, some variations were as tall as a grandfather clock and all used interchangeable large disks to play different sets of tunes. These were spring-wound and driven and both had a bell-like sound. The machines were often made in England, Italy, and the US, with additional disks made in Switzerland, Austria, and Prussia. Early "juke-box" pay versions of them existed in public places. Marsh's free Museum and curio shop in Long Beach, Washington, has several still-working versions of them on public display. The Musical Museum, Brentford, London, has a number of machines. The Morris Museum in Morristown, New Jersey, USA has a notable collection, including interactive exhibits. In addition to video and audio footage of each piece, the actual instruments are demonstrated for the public daily on a rotational basis.

=== Timeline ===
9th century: In Baghdad, the Banū Mūsā brothers, a trio of Persian inventors, produced "the earliest known mechanical musical instrument", in this case a hydropowered organ which played interchangeable cylinders automatically, which they described in their Book of Ingenious Devices. According to Charles B. Fowler, this "cylinder with raised pins on the surface remained the basic device to produce and reproduce music mechanically until the second half of the nineteenth century."

Early 13th century: In Flanders, an ingenious bell ringer invented a cylinder with pins which operates cams, which then hit the bells.

1598: Flemish clockmaker Nicholas Vallin produced a wall-mounted clock which has a pinned barrel playing on multiple tuned bells mounted in the superstructure. The barrel can be programmed, as the pins can be separately placed in the holes provided on the surface of the barrel.

1665: Ahasuerus Fromanteel in London made a table clock which has quarter striking and musical work on multiple bells operated by a pinned barrel. These barrels could be changed for those playing different tunes.

1772: A watch was made by one Ransonet at Nancy, France, which has a pinned drum, playing music not on bells but on tuned steel prongs arranged vertically.

1796: Antoine Favre-Salomon, a clockmaker from Geneva replaced the stack of bells by a comb with multiple pre-tuned metallic notes in order to reduce space. Together with a horizontally placed pinned barrel, this produced more varied and complex sounds. One of these first music boxes is now displayed at the Shanghai Gallery of Antique Music Boxes and Automata in Pudong's Oriental Art Center.

1877: Thomas Edison invents the phonograph, which has important consequences for the musical-box industry, especially around the end of the century.

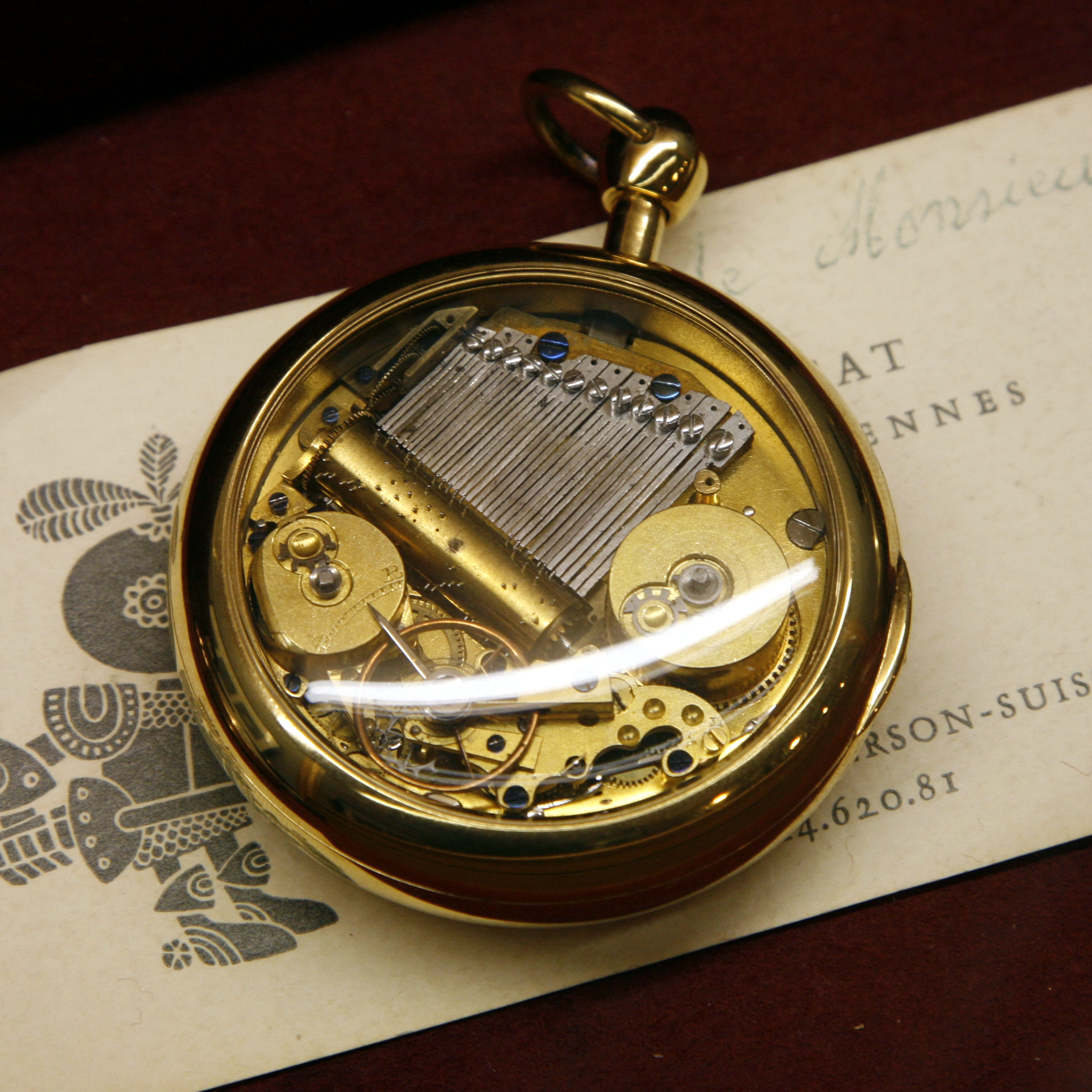
Pocket watch with musical movements

a Corgi Ice Cream Van music box toy car with the hand crank musical chime

In 2010 American jazz guitarist Pat Metheny released the album Orchestrion on which he performed alongside a variety of custom-designed and built acoustic and electromechanical orchestrions which comprised the rest of the "band", playing music in real-time through the MIDI file format.

== Repertoire ==
In 1974–1975, German composer Karlheinz Stockhausen composed Tierkreis, a set of twelve pieces on the signs of the zodiac, for twelve music boxes.

== See also ==
- Barrel organ
- Cuckoo clock
- Graphophone
- Musical clock
- Player piano
- Singing bird box
- Shanghai Gallery of Antique Music Boxes and Automata
- The Musical Museum, Brentford, London, England has several examples by makers including Nicole Frères, Regina and Popper which may be seen and heard.
