= Oriental Art Center =

Coordinates: 31.22495°N 121.536899°E

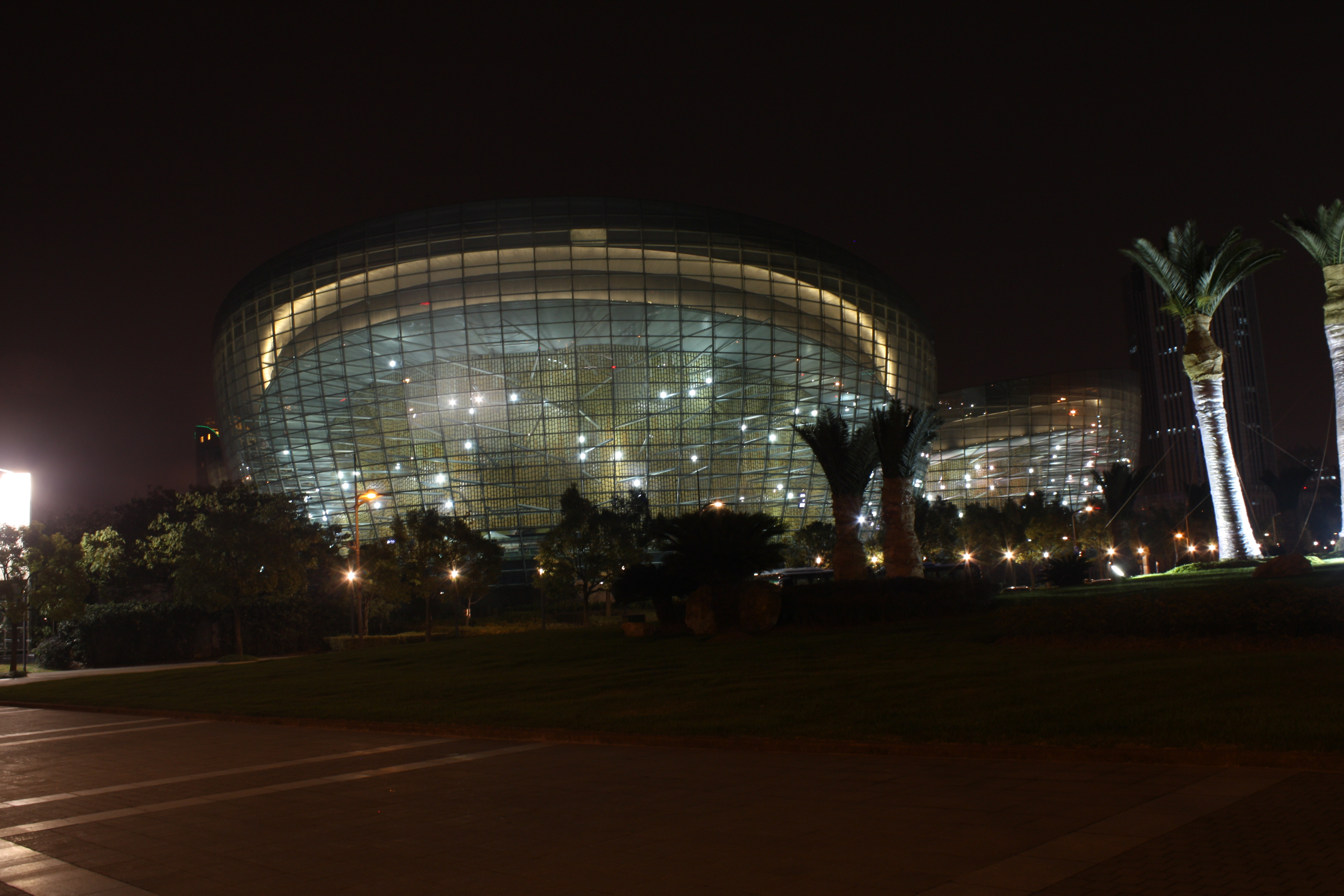
- Interactive map of the Oriental Art Center area

General information
- Type: Arts complex
- Location: Pudong, Shanghai
- Construction started: 26 March 2002
- Completed: 31 December 2004
- Inaugurated: 1 July 2005

Technical details
- Structural system: Reïnforced concrete frame, steel roof girder, glass facade

Design and construction
- Architect: Paul Andreu

Website
- www.shoac.com.cn

The Shanghai Oriental Art Center (simplified Chinese: 上海东方艺术中心; traditional Chinese: 上海東方藝術中心; pinyin: Shànghǎi Dōngfāng Yìshù Zhōngxīn), abbreviated SHOAC, is one of the leading performance and cultural facilities in Shanghai. The five interconnected hemispherical halls or "petals" are shaped to resemble a butterfly orchid from above. They comprise the Entrance Hall, the Concert Hall, the Opera Hall, the Performance Hall, and the Exhibition Hall. The high-tech ceiling changes color during the night to reflect the nature of the performances inside. Located off Century Avenue in Pudong, the SHOAC was opened with a New Year's Eve concert in 2004 and officially opened on July 1, 2005.

== History ==
The facility was jointly constructed by the Shanghai Municipal Government and Pudong New Area Government on a budget of 1.1 billion RMB. The right to operate its grounds were won by the Poly Culture and Arts Company in September 2003; they then partnered with the Wenhui-Xinmin United Press Group to establish the Shanghai Oriental Art Center Management Company, Limited. This company continues to manage the property and its subsidiary facilities, despite Poly's interest having been replaced by Beijing Poly Theatre Management in June 2009 and WXUPG's by the Shanghai United Media Group in January 2014.

== Performances ==
Various cultural and musical performances are held in the center, beginning from the 2005 Berlin Philharmonic Orchestra Shanghai Concert. It's a regular venue for concert performances and its popular "Chinese Traditional Opera Series" hosts performances by the China National Opera, the Shanghai Jingju Theatre Company and Shanghai Kunqu Company, and the Shanghai Yueju Opera Troupe. The OAC's Saturday Brunch Concerts claim audiences of over 100 000 every year.

== Facilities ==
=== Architecture ===
The building was designed by French architect Paul Andreu and the Huadong Architectural Design & Research Institute. The façades are mainly laminated glass incorporating perforated metal sheets. The dark granite floors and multi-layered glass screen walls aim to create a softly diffused forest floor effect. The separate "petals" of the construction are hung with large distinctly colored pebbles to differentiate them. The backstage facilities include an Orchestra Rehearsal Hall, Choir Rehearsal Hall, Dance Rehearsal Hall, and Integrated Rehearsal Hall.

=== Concert Hall ===
The Concert Hall has 1953 seats, a computer-controlled elevating stage, and an 88-diapason 5-layer organ by Austria's Rieger Pipe Organ. It houses 2 VIP and 7 regular dressing rooms.

=== Opera Hall ===
The Opera Hall has 1015 seats, divided into three areas and designed to recreate the intimate experience of Italian opera houses. The orchestra pit is 120 m^{2} (1,300 sq ft) and able to accommodate up to 100 musicians. The central stage provides computer-controlled side, ice, and ballet platforms in addition to the main large-scale platform. It houses 2 VIP and 15 common dressing rooms.

=== Performance Hall ===
The Performance Hall has 333 seats and is modeled on semicircular Roman theaters. Its performance floor is golden Swiss pearwood. It has 4 dressing rooms.

=== Exhibition Hall ===
The Exhibition Hall is located on the second floor of its petal of the Oriental Art Center. It covers 250 m^{2} (2,700 sq ft) and has 9.8-meter (32 ft) high walls.

=== Other facilities ===
The venue also features ancillary public facilities, including the 100-seat Paris Shanghai French restaurant open daily for lunch and dinner, the 530-square-meter (5,700 sq ft) Café Salon Etoile and an adjacent gift store, and 11 piano training classrooms. The Shanghai Gallery of Antique Music Boxes and Automata is located at the SHOAC, displaying over 200 antique music boxes and European automata, including the oldest extant music box in the world, constructed in 1796 by Antoine Favre-Salomon.

== Outreach ==
The Oriental Art Center engages with the broader public through free admission days every month, reduced-fare student tickets, and weekly lectures on art and music appreciation.
