= Roger Perrinjaquet =

Swiss inventor

- Born: 1935
- Died: 9 March 2000 (aged 64–65)

Roger Perrinjaquet (c. 1935 – 9 March 2000) was a Swiss inventor. He is considered the inventor of the electric immersion blender (stick blender).

== Invention of the immersion blender ==
In 1950, Perrinjaquet applied for a patent for a "portable kitchen appliance". The new mixer was named Bamix, an abbreviation of the French "battre et mixer" (to beat and mix). In 1954, Perrinjaquet sold his patents to ESGE KG, a company founded a year earlier by Messrs. Spingler and Gschwend. From the end of 1954, this company produced the first hand blenders in its factory in Germany. According to ESGE AG, Perrinjaquet described the world's first portable hand blender with his 1950 patent.

== Patents ==
1. Patent CH288357A: Appareil ménager portatif. Angemeldet am 6. März 1950, veröffentlicht am 31. Januar 1953, Erfinder: Roger Perrinjaquet.‌
2. Patent US2874014A: Drop-head machine. Angemeldet am 2. January 1957, veröffentlicht am 17. Februar 1959, Anmelder: Necchi Sewing Machine Sales Co, Erfinder: Roger Perrinjaquet.‌
3. Patentanmeldung DE1815020A1: Führungsschienenanordnung für Rennspielzeuge. Angemeldet am 17. Dezember 1968, veröffentlicht am 24. Juli 1969, Anmelder: Mattel Inc, Erfinder: Roger Paul Perrinjaquet.

== See also ==
- List of Swiss inventors and discoverers
