= Aurel Stodola =

Slovak engineer and physicist (1859–1942)

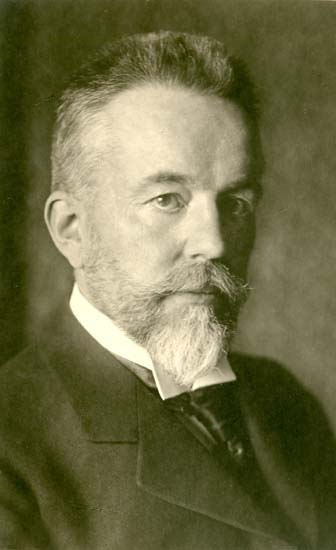
- Born: 10 May 1859; Liptovský Svätý Mikuláš, Kingdom of Hungary (today: Liptovský Mikuláš, Slovakia)
- Died: 25 December 1942 (aged 83); Zürich, Switzerland
- Resting place: Liptovský Mikuláš, Slovakia
- Education: Budapest University of Technology and Economics
- Known for: Centrifugal compressor Steam turbine Stodola's cone law Stodola's equation Gouy–Stodola theorem
- Awards: James Watt International Gold Medal (1941); Grashof Commemorative Medal (1908); ICM Speaker (1897)

Aurel Boleslav Stodola (11 May 1859 – 25 December 1942) was a Slovak engineer, physicist, and inventor. He was a pioneer in the area of technical thermodynamics and its applications and published his book Die Dampfturbine (the steam turbine) in 1903. In addition to the thermodynamic issues involved in turbine design the book discussed aspects of fluid flow, vibration, stress analysis of plates, shells and rotating discs and stress concentrations at holes and fillets. Stodola was a professor of mechanical engineering at the Swiss Polytechnical Institute (now ETH) in Zurich. He maintained friendly contact with Albert Einstein. In 1892, Stodola founded the Laboratory for Energy Conversion.

== Biography ==
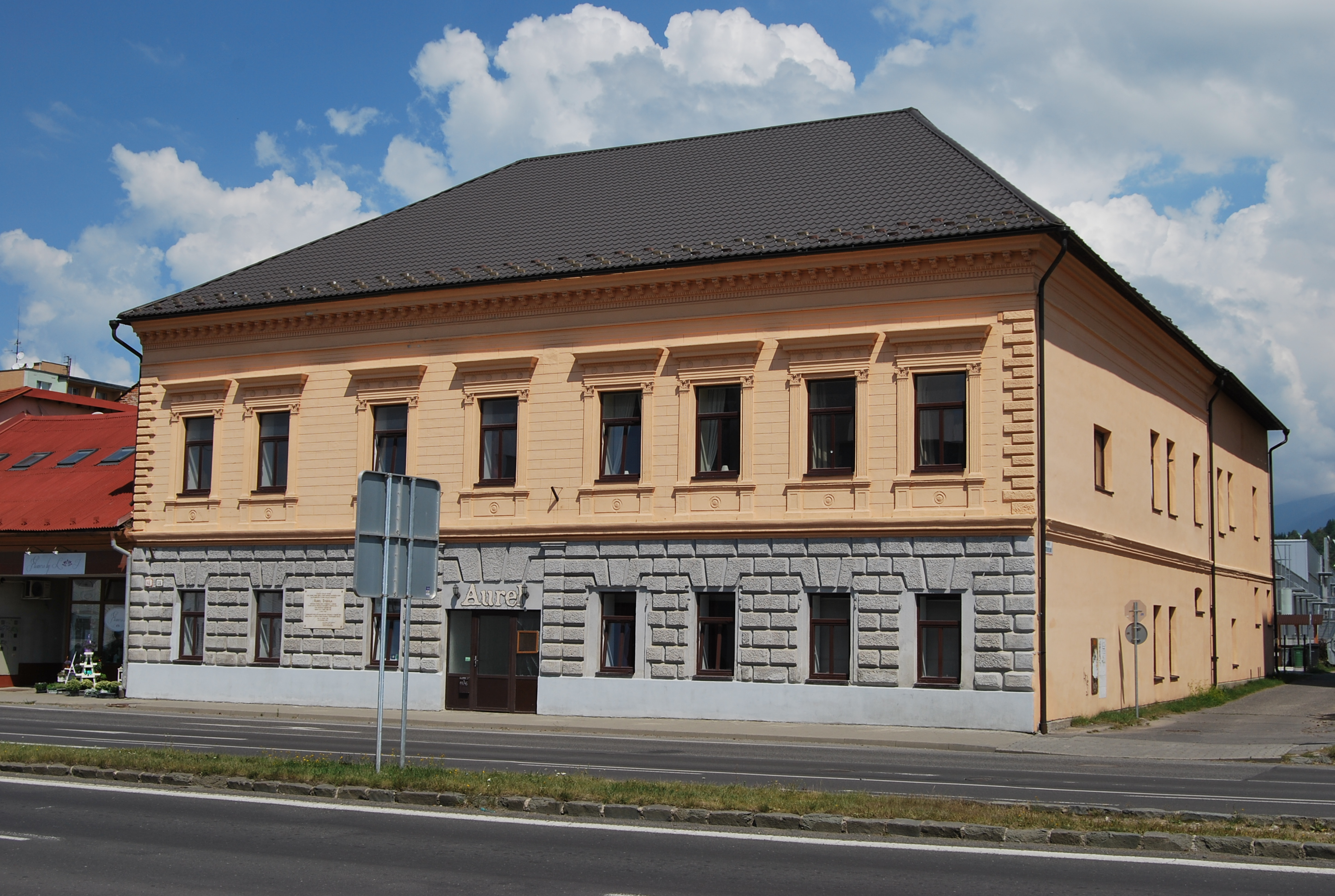
The birthplace in Liptovský Mikuláš (Slovakia)

Aurel Stodola was born in Vrbica-Hušták (now a part of region Liptovský Mikuláš), in the Kingdom of Hungary (now in Slovakia) on 11 May 1859. His father Ondrej Stodola was a leather manufacturer. His mother was Anna (born Kováčová). He was baptized as Aurel Bohuslav, but he used just name Aurel. He was baptized by the famous person of the Slovak emancipation movement, Protestant priest, poet, linguist, and representative of the Slovak national movement in 1840s Michal Miloslav Hodža.

=== Education ===
He attended a local primary school in Vrbica, Liptovský Mikuláš. After his first four years, he went to a town called Stráže pod Tatrami (now Poprad) in order to improve his German. There was a strong German speaking community and this practice was very common. He attended secondary education in Levoča, Kežmarok and Košice, where he completed his secondary schooling. He studied on his own as well, especially classics and languages.

In 1876, he moved to Budapest, where he studied two semesters at the Royal Jeseph University in Budapest. He was acknowledged as gifted student and he received a grant. In 1876, he transferred to the Eidgenössische Polytechnische Schule (Federal Polytechnic School), known today as the ETH Zurich. In 1881, he completed his degree in mechanical engineering. After graduation, he went to work in a factory in Budapest for seven months. In 1882/1883, he attended the Technische Hochschule in Charlottenburg (now Technische Universität Berlin).

After this, he volunteered in a technical studio in Paris. He wanted to improve his skills and French, as well. It was important for his future career in Switzerland. After this trip, he began to work in Prague as engineer. He improved his practical engineering and soon became a main engineer.

=== Zurich ===
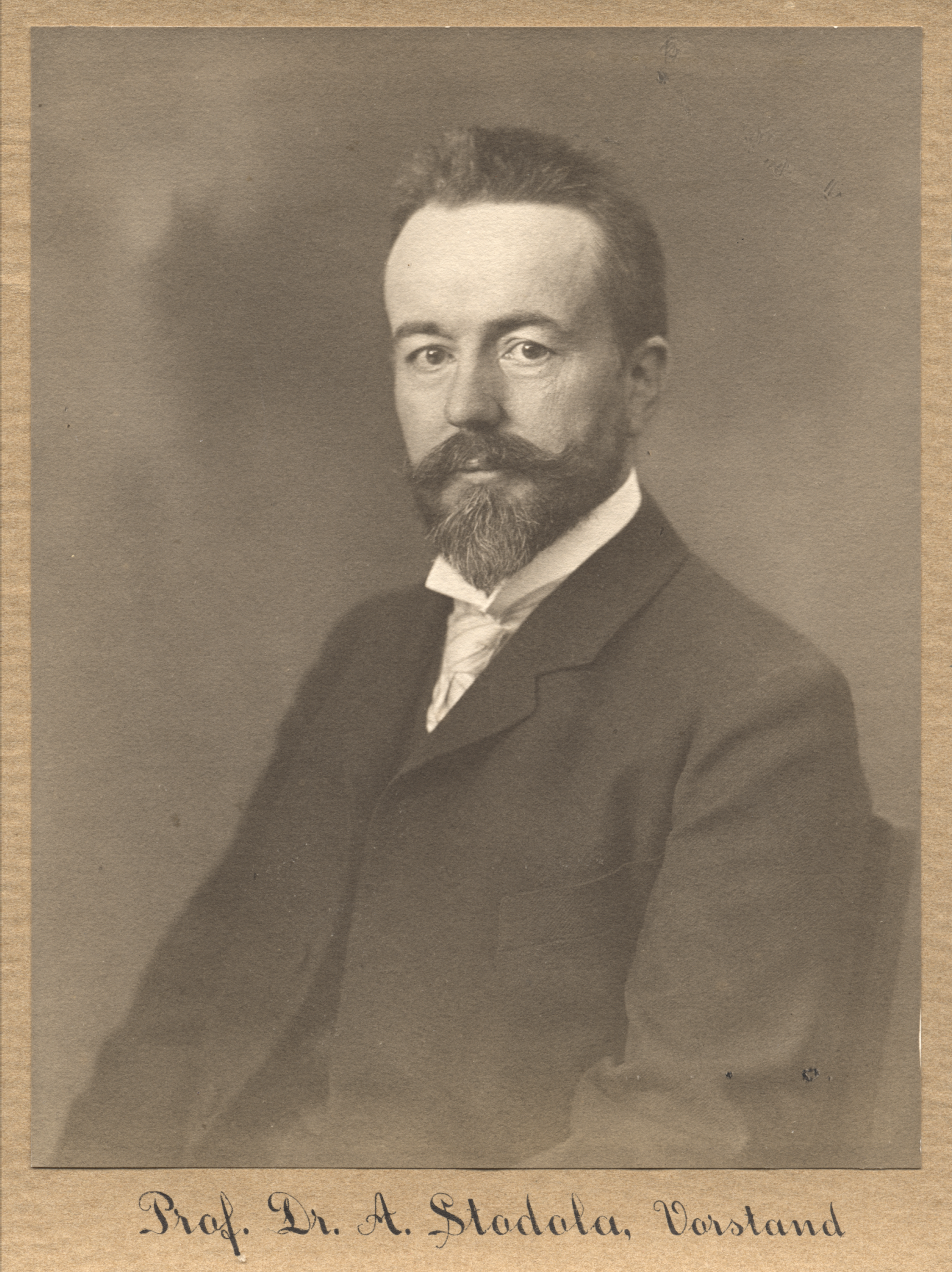
Aurel Stodola circa 1905

In 1892, he was appointed Professor of Machine Construction by the Polytechnikum in Zurich. He worked and taught at Polytechnikum until his retirement in 1929. He gave his first lecture on 23 October 1892. Stodola provided stimuli in the development of the curriculum and the construction of the first machine laboratory (now Laboratory for Energy Conversion). It was opened in 1900. He was invited as evaluator to The Exposition Universelle in Paris, during the same year.

He was awarded Swiss citizenship in 1905.

In 1924 he endowed a foundation with the stated aim "to promote the development of mechanical and electro-technical science in the ETH". This foundation still exists today.

He maintained friendly contact with academics in Switzerland and abroad, including Albert Einstein. Einstein wrote him an impressive letter for his anniversary. Einstein was not his student, as some sources say, because he studied physics and mathematics. Another prominent friend was theologian, organist, writer, humanitarian, philosopher, and physician Albert Schweizer. Stodola encouraged Swiss businessmen to support Schweitzer's hospital in Africa.

Stodola retired at the age of 70. Then, he did not teach, but he carried on as expert and advisor. He was also interested in theoretical physics and philosophy. In 1931, he published his book on the philosophy of technology Gedanken zu einer Weltanschauung vom Standpunkte des Ingenieurs (Thoughts of a worldview from the standpoint of the engineer). The title of the fourth and fifth edition was Die geheimnisvolle Naturweltanschauliche Betrachtung. It was his contribution to social, political and technological issues of his time. This book was reprinted several times and made a significant contribution to the technical philosophy in Europe.

Stodola's farewell lecture is also included in this publication. In 1939, he led a team at Brown Boveri in the first test worldwide using a gas turbine to generate electricity. This machine is still exhibited today at the Alstom works in Birr and due to its importance is considered to be an ‘historical milestone in mechanical engineering’.

He died on 25 December 1942 in Zurich. His remains were moved to his birthplace in 1989 because the ETH declined to pay upkeep for the grave.

== Steam and gas turbines ==
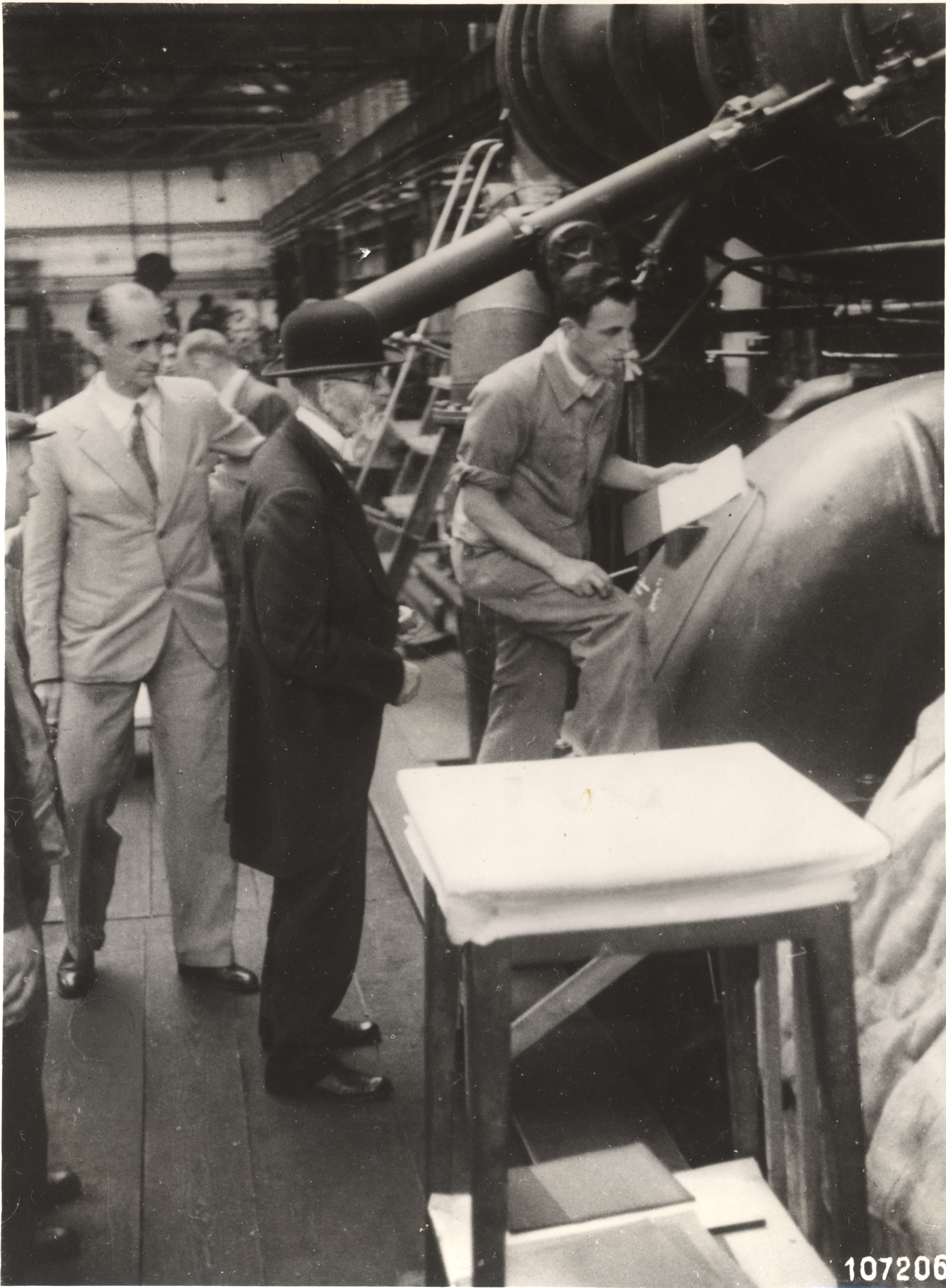
Aurel Stodola and the first test worldwide using a gas turbine to generate electricity at Brown, Boveri

In 1903, one of his major textbooks Die Dampfturbine (the Steam Turbine) was first published. This was translated into several languages and formed a groundbreaking basis for the construction of thermal turbo-machinery.

The Law of the Ellipse, or Stodola's cone law, provides a method for calculating the highly nonlinear dependence of extraction pressures with a flow for multistage turbine with high backpressure, when the turbine nozzles are not choked. It is important in turbine off-design calculations.

Stodola's book Steam and Gas Turbines was cited by Soviet rocket scientist Fridrikh Tsander in the 1920s. Published in English in 1927 and reprinted many times up to 1945, it was a basic reference for engineers working on the first generation of jet propulsion engines in the United States. Stodola worked closely with industries on the development of the first practical gas turbines, in particular Brown, Boveri & Cie, who built the first gas turbine-powered electric generator in 1939.

== Medical equipment ==
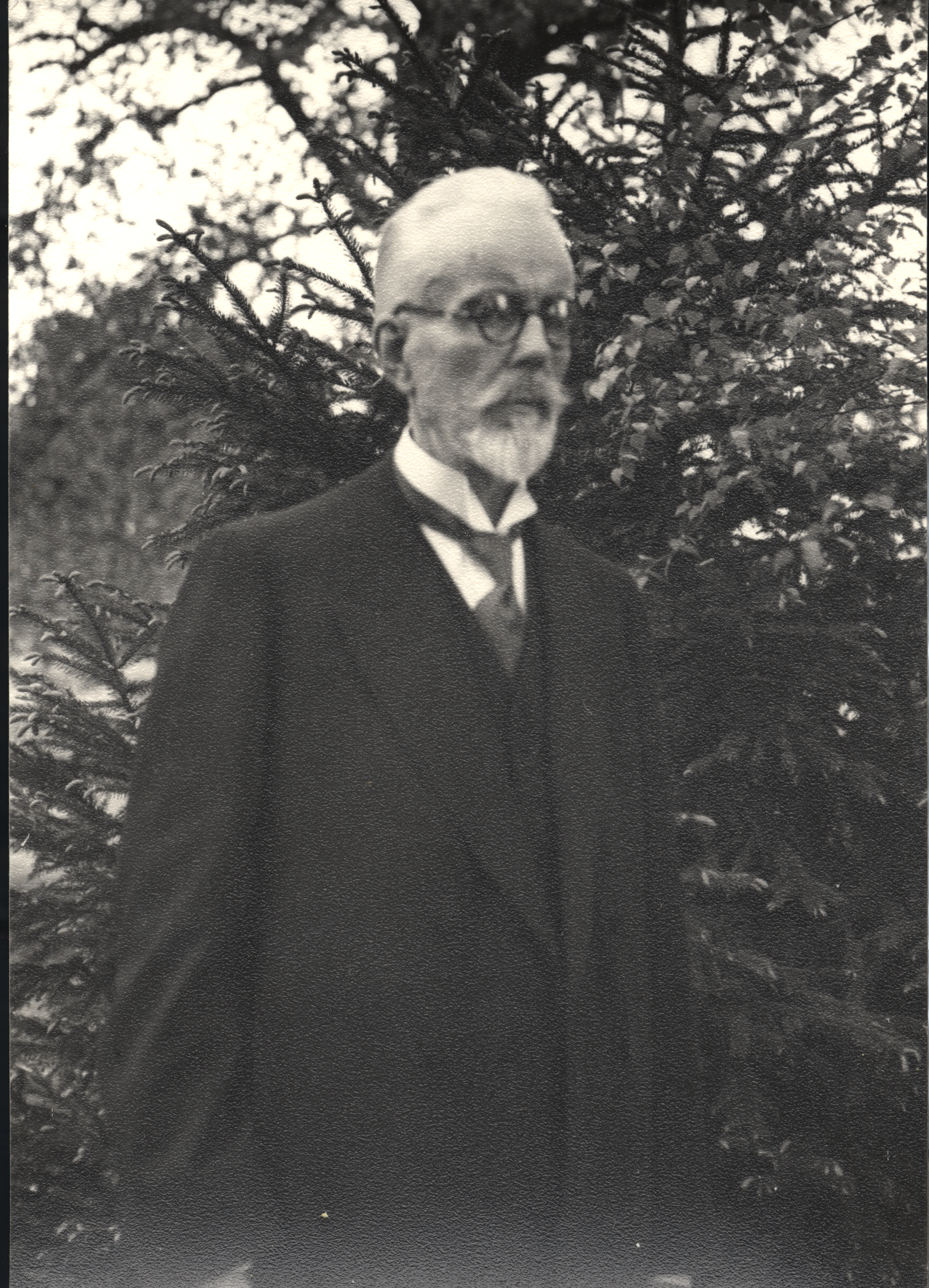
Stodola circa 1930

In 1915–1916 Stodola collaborated with German surgeon Ferdinand Sauerbruch to develop an advanced mechanically driven prosthetic arm. This collaboration marked one of the first documented examples of a surgeon and engineer merging efforts. Sauerbruch said, "Henceforth, surgeon, physiologist, and technician (prosthetist/engineer) will have to work together."

== Honors ==
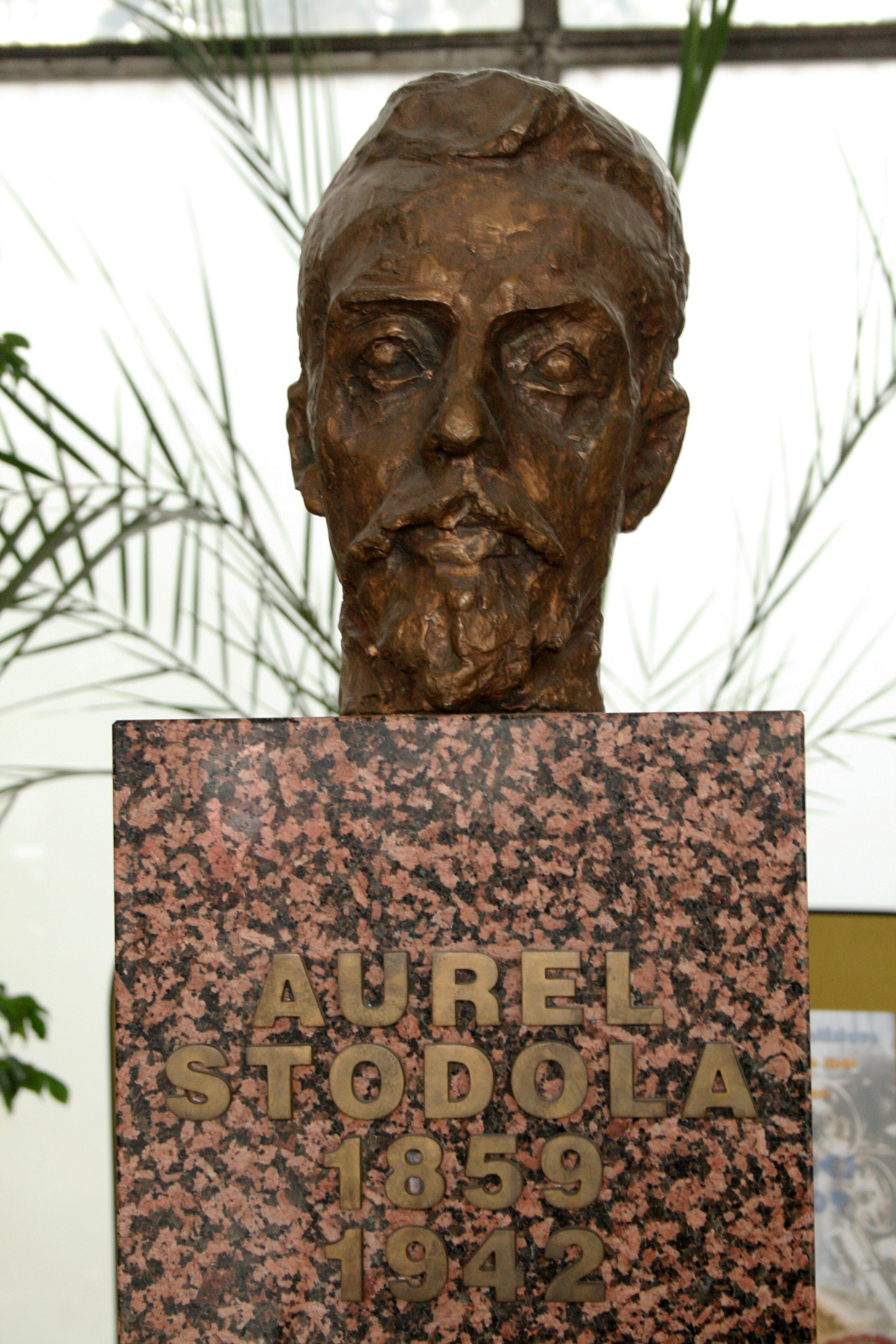
Aurel Stodola's bust in Slovak University of Technology in Bratislava, Slovakia

- 1905 – Honorary degree from Leibniz University Hannover
- 1908 – Grashof medal from Verein Deutscher Ingenieure
- Honorary degree from German Technical University in Brno
- 1929 – Honorary degree from Charles University of Prague
- 1941 – James Watt International Medal
- 1941 - Honorary member of the American Society of Mechanical Engineers
- Corresponding member of French Academy of Sciences.

== See also ==
- Heat pump
- Timeline of jet power
