= Laboratory for Energy Conversion =

LEC Zurich, Switzerland
- Type: Public
- Established: 1892
- Location: Zurich, Canton of Zurich, Switzerland; 47°22′35.10″N 8°32′53.17″E
- Campus: Urban

The Laboratory for Energy Conversion (LEC) formerly known as Turbomachinery Laboratory (LSM) was founded in 1892 by Aurel Boleslav Stodola. As part of the Federal Institute of Technology Zurich (ETH). The laboratory has been headed by some of the most prominent mechanical engineers in the history of turbomachinery.

== Areas of research ==
The current research projects at LEC cover the fields of:

- energy economics and policy
- performance and reliability of wind energy
- minimizing high-cycle fatigue failure of compressors
- efficiency improvements of turbomachines
- aircraft noise suppression
- cooling and thermal management
- laser produced plasma source (EUV) and debris mitigation
- development of a mobile power pack
- novel measurement techniques
- biomedical diagnostics

== Awards ==
Amongst many noted achievements, LEC has recently developed the FENT probe. This probe, for the first time, enables measurement of entropy generation in Turbomachinery. The highly rated peer-review journal Measurement Science and Technology recognised the development of this probe as the most outstanding contribution in the field of fluid mechanics in 2008.

== Professors since 1892 ==
- 1892 - 1929 Aurel Boleslav Stodola
- 1929 - 1954 Henri Quiby
- 1954 - 1983 Prof. Walter Traupel
- 1983 - 1998 George Gyarmathy
- 1998 - Prof. Reza Abhari

== Industry partners ==
- ABB Group, Switzerland
- BKW FMB Energie AG, Switzerland
- EOS Holding, Switzerland
- General Electric, US
- MAN Turbo AG, Switzerland
- Mitsubishi Heavy Industries, Japan
- MTU, Germany
- Siemens, US, Germany
- Swisselectric Research, Switzerland
- Toshiba, Japan

== See also ==
- Brown, Boveri & Cie
- Charles Algernon Parsons
- Gustaf de Laval
