= Bamix =

Swiss manufacturing company

ESGE AG (Bamix)
- Type: Private
- Industry: Small appliances
- Founded: 1953; 73 years ago in Germany, 1954 as the Bamix brand
- Founders: Werner Spingler; Josef Gschwend
- Headquarters: Mettlen, Switzerland
- Area served: Worldwide
- Key people: Erich Eigenmann, CEO
- Products: Immersion blenders
- Owners: Hans Jud; Erich Eigenmann
- Number of employees: 55
- Website: www.bamix.com

ESGE AG, operating under the brand name Bamix (stylized bamix), is a Swiss company founded in 1953 that is active in the sector of electrical kitchen appliances. It is known for the Bamix, a hand-held blender which was invented by Roger Perrinjaquet, a Swiss engineer, and fully produced in Switzerland. ESGE AG also produces appliances which are co-branded. The models are Mono, Classic, DeLuxe, SwissLine, Superbox, Gastro, and SliceSy.

The company name, ESGE, comes from the initials of Spingler and Gschwend ("Es" and "Ge"), the founders of the original company, founded in Germany. Bamix is distributed worldwide in more than 40 countries with mainly exclusive distributors. In Germany, the company is marketed under the brand ESGE Zauberstab (English: "ESGE Magic Wand").

== History ==
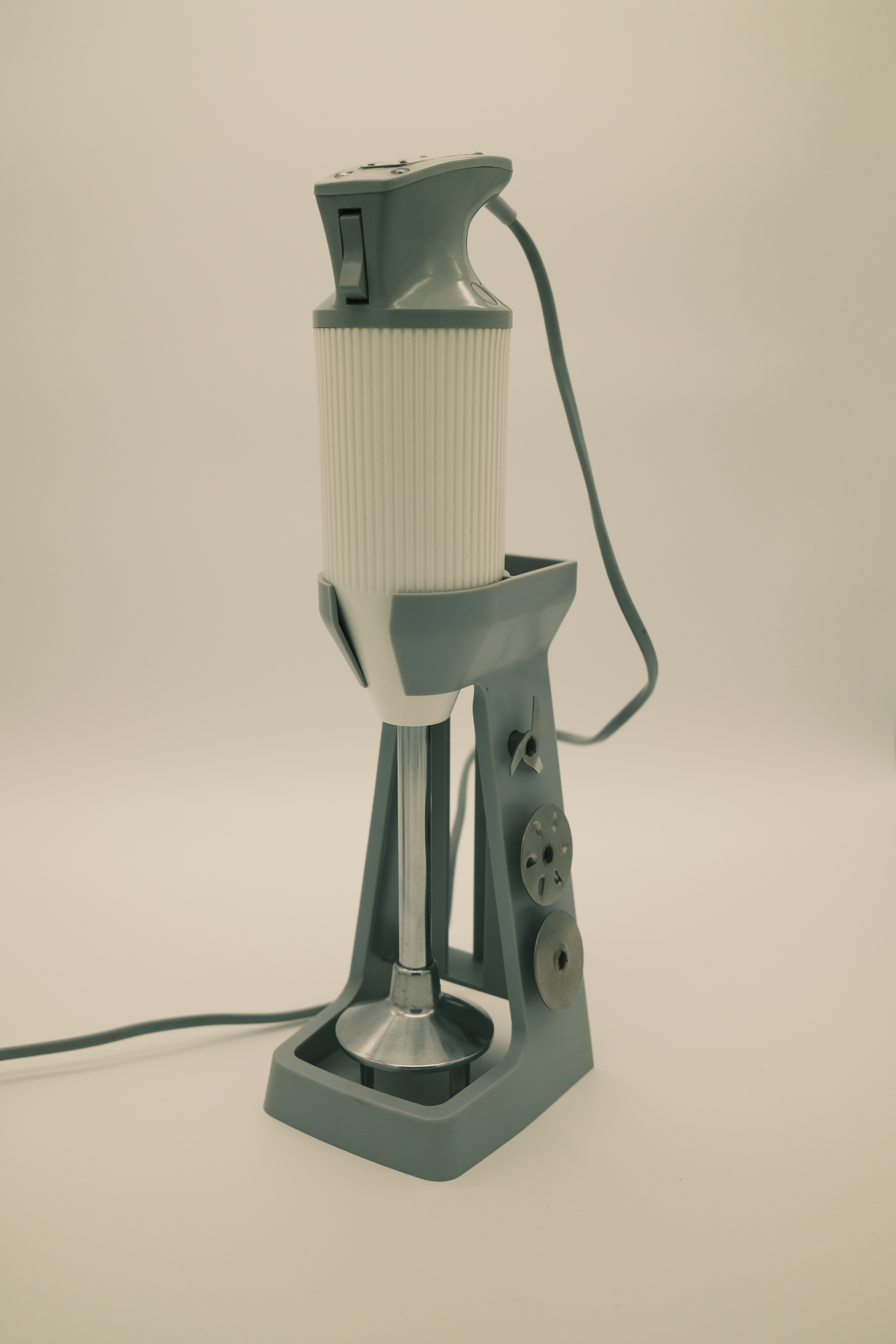
A Bamix model M100 wand blender with accessories from the 1960's.

In 1950, the Swiss engineer Roger Perrinjaquet invented an appliance, which was patented on 6 March 1950 under the section handheld appliances. The application described the world's first stick (or wand) blender. His wish was to work with this appliance directly in pans on the stove. He called the new appliance Bamix, an abbreviation of the French words battre et mixer (English: beat and mix).

Without having investors, Perrinjaquet sold the patent rights in 1954 to ESGE Werner Spingler KG, founded in 1953, which was initially producing bicycle racks, electrical kitchen knives, watches and small electrical motors. By the end of the year, the company produced the first wand blenders. In 1957, the company changed its name to ESGE Gschwend + Spingler KG. The product range was expanded to include hand-held vacuum cleaners, citrus juicers, and toasters. At the end of the 1950s, the company launched the fabrication of the first handheld blenders in series. At the beginning of the 1960s, several production sites were opened, including the current head office of the company in Mettlen, in the canton Thurgau. During this period, the daily production amounted to 250 blenders. In 1963, sales of the Bamix completely collapsed in Germany. In 1964, the founders Spingler and Gschwend sold their company to the US conglomerate General Electric. The Americans planned to restructure the group and closed all production sites except the locations in Mettlen, Switzerland and Neuffen, Germany.

Despite improving sales figures beginning from 1967, General Electric decided to sell the company off in 1971. As the biggest buyer of Bamix food processors, Walter Bodart from Belgium purchased the production company in Switzerland with all rights for Bamix and ESGE Zauberstab, and introduced a strategy based on quality and a single product. ESGE AG in Mettlen became the only production site for Bamix. In 1983, the daily production reached 1,600 units. In 1986, Bodart agreed to a management buyout and sold ESGE AG to Valentin Gunsch (finance), Max Rüttimann (technology), and Werner Stahl (marketing). In 2002, Gunsch, Rüttimann, and Stahl sold the group to Hans Jud and Erich Eigenmann. Erich Eigenmann has served as CEO of ESGE AG since 1 October 2002. Since then the focus was on quality, branding and building up new markets to cover all relevant distribution channels in the markets. As of 2010, production capacity was 2,000 blenders per day.
