= Immersion blender =

Kitchen appliance

An immersion blender, also known as a stick blender, mini blender, hand blender, or wand blender, is a kitchen blade grinder used to blend ingredients or purée food in the container in which they are being prepared. The immersion blender was invented in Switzerland by Roger Perrinjaquet, who patented the idea on March 6, 1950. He called the new appliance "bamix", a portmanteau of the French "battre et mixer" (beat and mix). Larger immersion blenders for commercial use are sometimes nicknamed boat motors (popularized by Emeril Lagasse and Alton Brown). Uses include puréeing soups and emulsifying sauces. An immersion blender comprises an electric motor driving rotating cutting blades at the end of a shaft which can be immersed in the food being blended, inside a housing which can be held by hand. The shaft with blades is often detachable to facilitate cleaning, and there may be multiple different attachments available. Some blenders can be used in a pan while on the stove. Immersion blenders are distinguished from worktop blenders and food processors that require food to be placed in a special vessel for processing, and from hand mixers, which mix but do not chop.

Models for home and light commercial use typically have an immersible shaft length of about 16 centimetres (6.3 in), but heavy-duty commercial models are available with a shaft up to 53 centimetres (21 in) or more. Home models are available in corded or cordless versions. Motor power rating ranges from about 120 W to over 600 W for a heavy-duty model. Domestic models may be supplied with a goblet or other accessories.

== Gallery ==
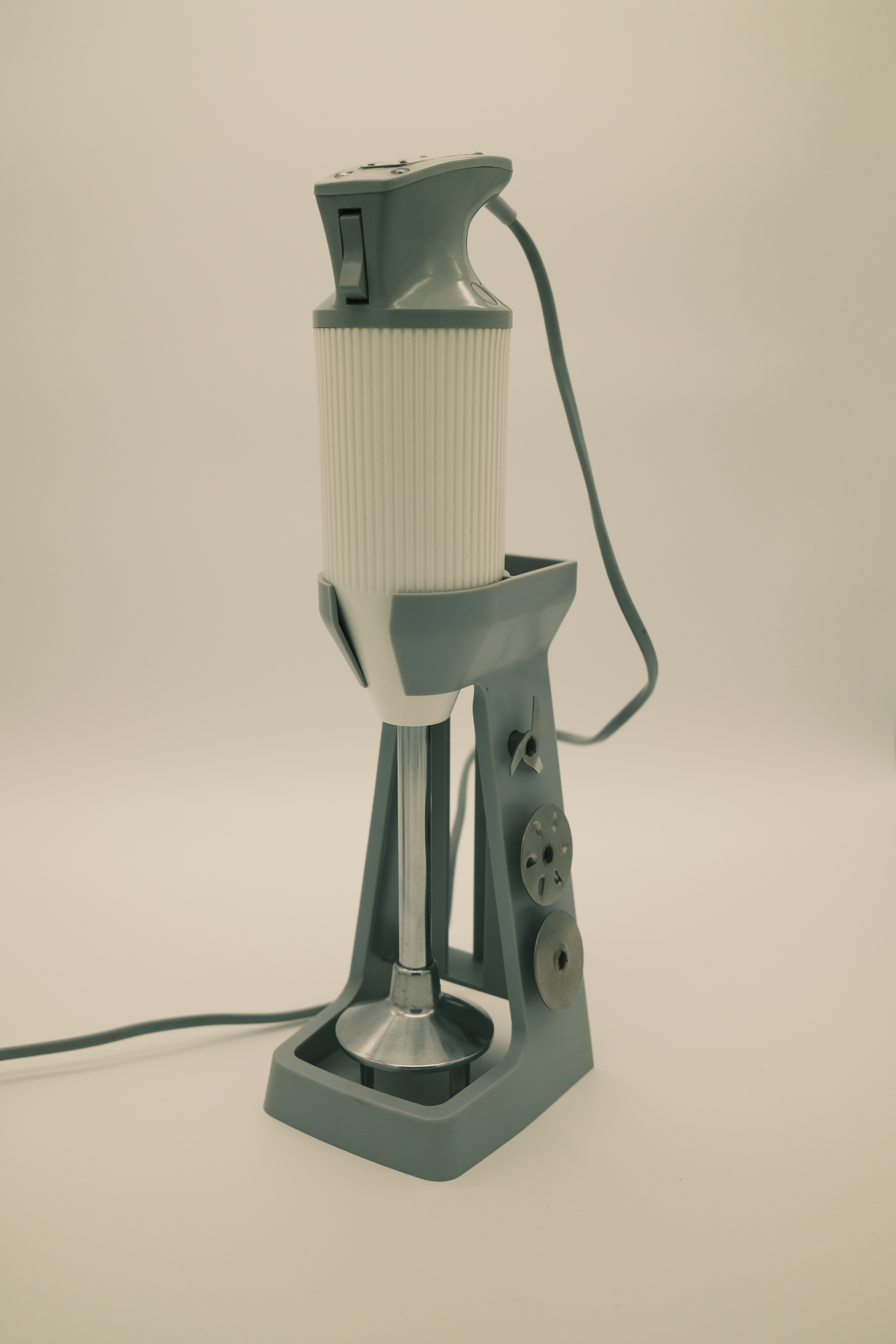
A Bamix model M100 wand blender with accessories from the 1960's.

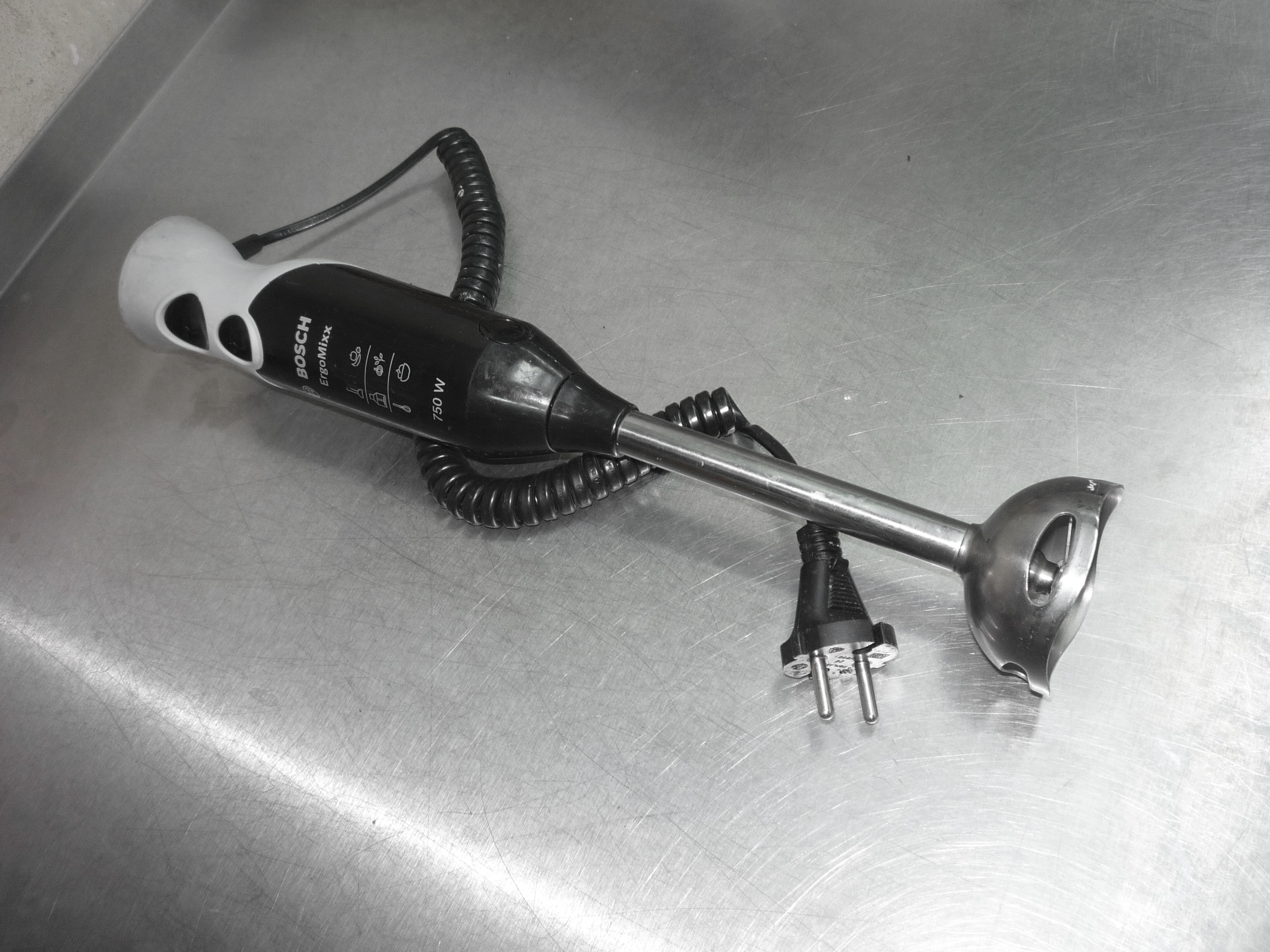
A Bosch immersion blender

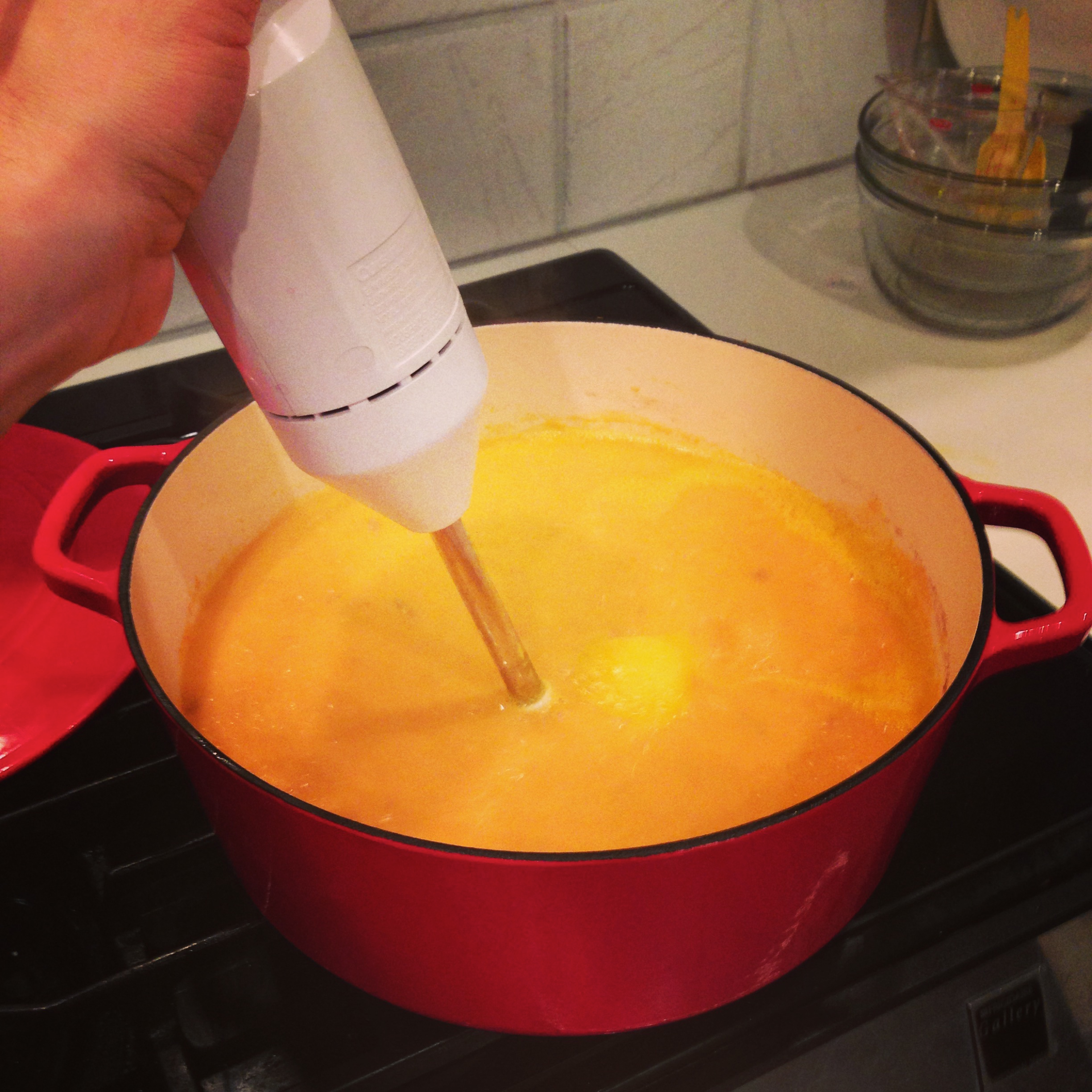
An immersion blender being used to blend soup on the stove

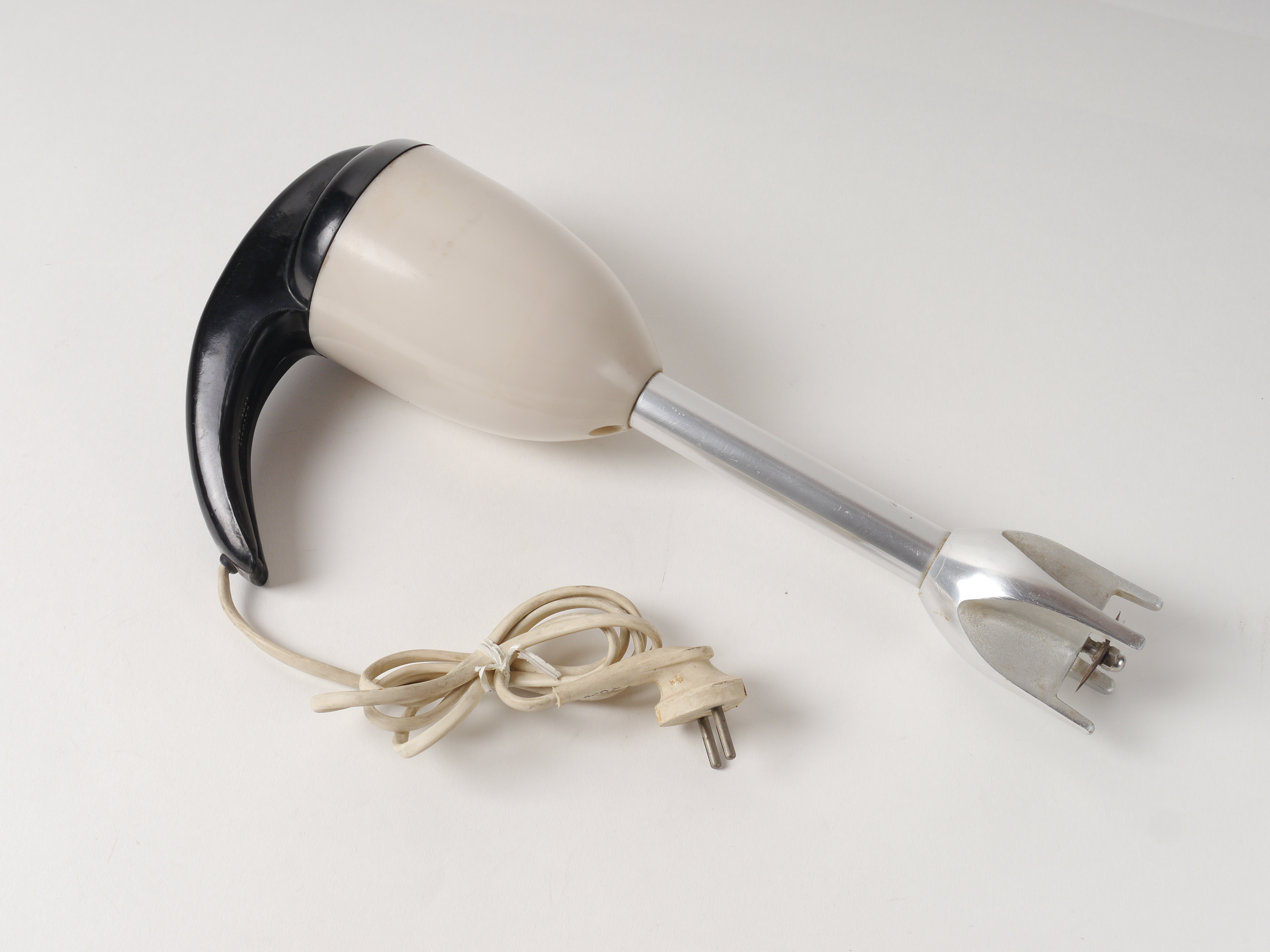
Electric hand blender from the brand Kalorik (from the collection of The Museum of Industry in Ghent)
