= Jacques E. Brandenberger =

Swiss chemist, inventor of cellophane (1872–1954)

Jacques Edwin Brandenberger
- Born: 19 October 1872; Zurich, Switzerland
- Died: 13 July 1954 (aged 81); Zurich, Switzerland
- Education: University of Bern
- Known for: Invention of cellophane
- Awards: Elliott Cresson Medal (1937)
- Scientific career
- Fields: Chemistry

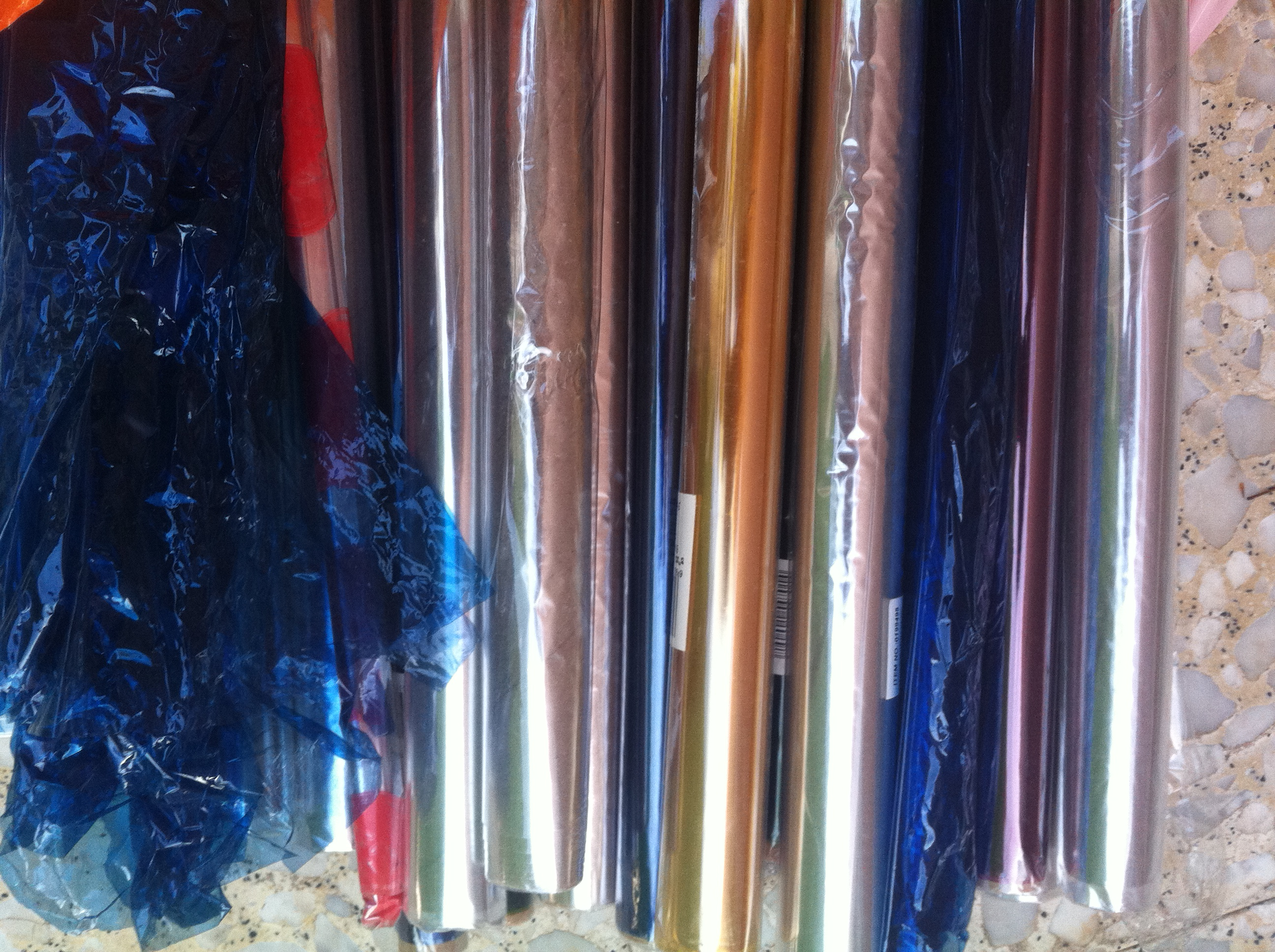
Modern cellophane of various colors

Jacques Edwin Brandenberger (19 October 1872 – 13 July 1954) was a Swiss chemist and textile engineer who invented cellophane in 1908.

Brandenberger was born in Zurich in 1872. He graduated from the University of Bern in 1895. In 1908, he invented cellophane. Made from wood cellulose, cellophane was originally intended to coat cloth to make it more resistant to staining. After further research and refinement, Brandenberger began production of cellophane film in 1912, marketing it for industrial purposes. He sold the US rights to DuPont in 1923.

In 1937, the Franklin Institute awarded him the Elliott Cresson Medal by for his invention and promotion of cellophane. .
