= René Sommer =

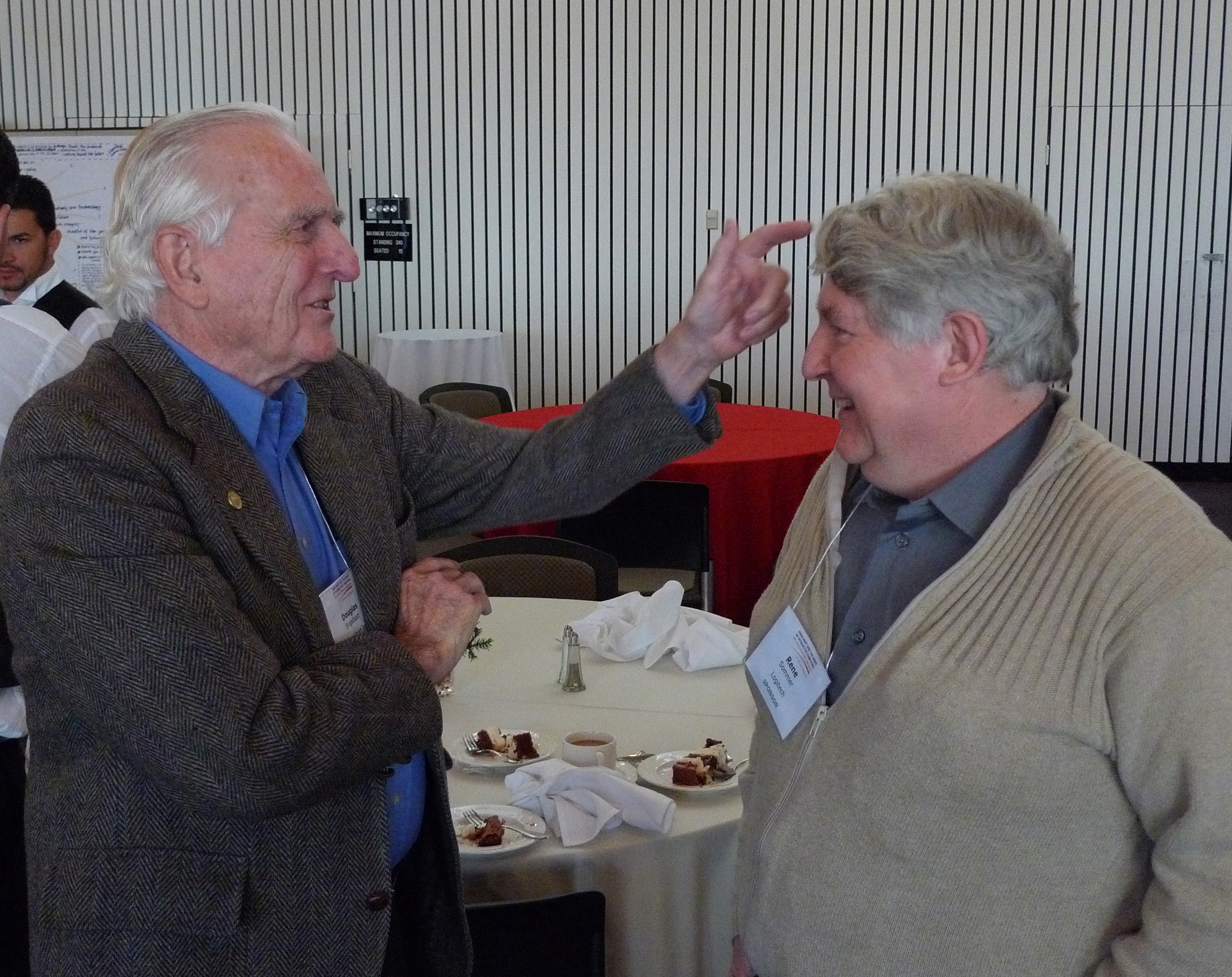
Rene Sommer (right) with Douglas Engelbart (left)

René Sommer (1951 – 5 October 2009) was a Swiss inventor and computer programmer, credited as a co-inventor of the computer mouse.

Along with Professor Jean-Daniel Nicoud and André Guignard, Sommer helped invent the computer mouse at the Swiss Federal Institute of Technology in Lausanne. Sommer was credited for making the mouse "more intelligent" by adding a micro-processor to the mouse's design in 1985.

Sommer died on 5 October 2009 in Saint-Légier, Vaud, Switzerland, at the age of 58.

Logitech, which manufactured the original mouse, called Sommer a ‘brilliant and impassioned engineer’ in reaction to his death.
