= Antoine Favre-Salomon =

Swiss watchmaker (1734-1820)

Antoine Favre-Salomon (30 November 1734 – 17 August 1820) was a Swiss watchmaker. In 1796, he invented a pocket watch with an embedded musical mechanism. which was later recognised as the first "comb" music box. One of his surviving music boxes has been displayed at the Shanghai Gallery of Antique Music Boxes and Automata in Pudong's Oriental Art Center and is now in the Reuge museum in Kyoto, Japan.
