= Acoplanarity =

In the context of experiments involving quantum chromodynamics, acoplanarity can arise from the emission of gluons from the scattered final state particles.

In particle physics, the acoplanarity of a scattering experiment is an event shape observable which measures the degree to which the paths of the scattered particles deviate from being coplanar. Measurements of acoplanarity provide a test of perturbative quantum chromodynamics (pQCD) because quantum chromodynamics (QCD) predicts that the emission of gluons can lead to acoplanar scattering events.

== Measures of acoplanarity ==
For a two-jet final state, a useful measure of acoplanarity is

$$\varphi = \pi-( \phi_2 - \phi_1 )$$

where $\phi_i$ are the azimuthal angles of the final state jets with respect to the beam line. An alternative measure of acoplanarity which is infrared safe and which works for broad jets of many particles is given by

$$A = 4 \min{ \left( \frac{ \sum_i |p_{out}^i| }{ \sum_i |p_i| } \right)^2}$$

where $p_i$ are the momenta of the final state particles and $p_{out}^i$ are the components of these momenta perpendicular to a plane chosen such that A is minimized. In the case of two coplanar final state particles, the plane which minimizes A would contain the paths of both particles and the beamline, and A would equal 0.

== See also ==
- Color confinement
- Asymptotic freedom
- Dijet event
