= Snowmass accord =

1990 agreement on standard jet definitions in particle physics

The Snowmass Accord is an agreement on the definition of hadronic jets reached by a group of theorists and experimentalists at the 1990 Summer Study on High Energy Physics in Snowmass, Colorado. It was published as "Toward a Standardization of Jet Definitions" by J. E. Huth and 10 co-authors. The accord had two parts: a list of general properties that any jet definition should satisfy, and a specific fixed-radius cone algorithm in pseudorapidity–azimuth space intended for use by both hadron collider experiments and theoretical calculations.

The cone specification proved incomplete in practice. Cone algorithms also needed procedures for choosing seeds and for splitting and merging overlapping cones, and the seeded algorithms that resulted were later shown to be infrared unsafe. The general criteria, by contrast, have remained a standard reference point. They are routinely cited in reviews of jet algorithms, and the sequential-recombination algorithms used at the Large Hadron Collider are often presented as the first practical algorithms to satisfy them fully.

== Background ==
In hadron collisions, quarks and gluons produced in a hard scattering appear in detectors as collimated sprays of hadrons. Turning those hadrons, or the calorimeter energy they deposit, into jets requires an explicit algorithm, and the result depends on the algorithm and its parameters. Many jet definitions had been developed since the first jet algorithm, proposed by Sterman and Weinberg in the 1970s.

This became a practical problem around 1990, when the first next-to-leading order (NLO) QCD calculations of inclusive jet cross sections at hadron colliders appeared, from S. D. Ellis, Z. Kunszt and D. E. Soper, and from F. Aversa, P. Chiappetta, M. Greco and J. P. Guillet. A meaningful comparison between such calculations and data requires that both use the same jet definition, applicable both to a handful of partons in a calculation and to many particles or calorimeter towers in an experiment.

== The 1990 Snowmass Summer Study ==
The accord came out of the 1990 Summer Study on High Energy Physics, "Research Directions for the Decade", held in Snowmass, Colorado, from 25 June to 13 July 1990. It was written up as a short contribution to the proceedings (pages 134–136) and also circulated as Fermilab report FERMILAB-CONF-90-249-E, dated December 1990.

The eleven authors were J. E. Huth, N. Wainer, K. Meier, N. Hadley, F. Aversa, M. Greco, P. Chiappetta, J. P. Guillet, S. Ellis, Z. Kunszt and D. E. Soper. The group combined experimentalists with the members of both theory groups then computing NLO jet cross sections. Later reviews describe the authors as an influential group of theorists and Tevatron experimentalists.

== Content ==
=== General criteria ===
The best-known part of the accord is a list of properties that a jet definition should have. In paraphrase, a jet definition should be:

1. straightforward to implement in an experimental analysis;
2. straightforward to implement in a theoretical calculation;
3. defined at any order of perturbation theory;
4. such that it yields finite cross sections at any order of perturbation theory;
5. such that its cross sections are relatively insensitive to hadronization.

The first two requirements mean the same algorithm must accept partons as input in a calculation and particles, tracks or calorimeter towers as input in an experiment. The fourth is in effect a requirement of infrared and collinear safety. The fifth asks that jet observables depend as little as possible on non-perturbative effects such as hadronization and the underlying event.

=== Cone definition ===
The accord also specified a cone algorithm. A jet is a direction in pseudorapidity ($\eta$) and azimuth ($\phi$) that maximizes the transverse energy flowing through a cone of fixed radius $R$ around it. A particle or calorimeter cell $i$ belongs to the cone if its distance from the jet axis satisfies

$$\sqrt{(\eta_i-\eta_J)^2+(\phi_i-\phi_J)^2}\le R .$$

The jet is treated as massless. Its transverse energy is the scalar sum of the constituents' transverse energies, and its direction is the transverse-energy-weighted centroid:

$$E_T=\sum_{i\in\mathrm{cone}}E_{T,i},\qquad \eta_J=\frac{1}{E_T}\sum_{i\in\mathrm{cone}}E_{T,i}\,\eta_i,\qquad \phi_J=\frac{1}{E_T}\sum_{i\in\mathrm{cone}}E_{T,i}\,\phi_i .$$

A jet is a "stable" cone: one whose centroid, computed from its contents, coincides with the axis used to draw it.

== Implementation and limitations ==
Cone algorithms used at hadron colliders had to settle two questions: where to start the search for stable cones, and what to do when stable cones overlapped. The CDF experiment at the Tevatron used an iterative cone algorithm, JetClu, that started from seed towers above an energy threshold and added a split–merge step for overlapping cones. Other experiments made different choices; DØ, for example, applied no seed threshold. In practice, cone jets were therefore not identical from one experiment to another.

These additions also broke the accord's own requirements. Starting the search from seeds made the result sensitive to soft emissions: an extra soft particle could act as a new seed and change the jets found, and in the limit of an arbitrarily soft seed threshold the algorithm was no longer infrared safe. At parton level, theorists approximated the experimental behavior with an extra parameter, $R_\mathrm{sep}$, controlling when two partons were merged into one jet. For Tevatron Run II, a QCD workshop recommended the midpoint cone algorithm, which additionally searches for stable cones starting from the midpoints between pairs of stable cones. Later analysis showed that seeded cone algorithms, including the midpoint variant, remained infrared unsafe at higher orders. The seedless SISCone algorithm, published in 2007, was the first cone algorithm shown to satisfy infrared and collinear safety.

== Legacy ==
The accord was an early attempt to standardize jet definitions across experiments and between theory and experiment. Its title, "toward" a standardization, has been read as a sign that the authors did not yet know what the standard definition should be, nor how to meet their own criteria at a hadron collider.

Sequential-recombination algorithms offered an alternative without the split–merge ambiguities of cones. The k_{T} algorithm was adapted to hadron collisions in 1993. The Cambridge–Aachen (C/A) algorithm, whose original form dates from 1997, clusters particles purely by angular distance. Its angular ordering makes it the standard choice for reclustering the constituents of large-radius jets and declustering them in substructure studies, as in the mass-drop and soft-drop taggers. The anti-k_{T} algorithm, introduced in 2008, produces regular, cone-like jets while remaining infrared and collinear safe. It became the default jet algorithm of the ATLAS and CMS experiments at the LHC.

The Snowmass criteria remain the standard checklist against which jet algorithms are judged and are reproduced in textbooks and lecture notes on jet physics.

== See also ==
- Jet (particle physics)
- Hadronization
- Quantum chromodynamics
- Snowmass Process
