= Loeske Kruuk =

British biologist (1970–2026)

- Born: March 1970
- Died: 31 October 2026 (aged 56)
- Education: University of Oxford; University of Edinburgh
- Occupation: Ecologist
- Employer(s): University of Cambridge (1997–2000); University of Edinburgh (2000–2026); Australian National University (2012–2021)
- Awards: Philip Leverhulme Prize (2006); ZSL Scientific Medal (2008); Fellowship of the Royal Society of Edinburgh (2012); Mary Lyon Medal (2015); Australian Laureate Fellowship (2020)

Loeske E. B. Kruuk FRS FRSE (March 1970 – 31 October 2026) was an evolutionary ecologist who was a Royal Society Research Professor at the University of Edinburgh. She was awarded the 2018 European Society for Evolutionary Biology President's Award. In 2023, she was elected as a Fellow of the Royal Society. Kruuk died in October 2026 after battling an aggressive form of cancer.

== Education and early research ==
Kruuk started her academic career in 1988 studying mathematics at Somerville College, Oxford. She switched to biology with an MSc in Ecology at the University of Aberdeen, and then a PhD in population genetics at the University of Edinburgh, where she investigated amphibian hybrid zones with Nick Barton. For postdoctoral research with Tim Clutton-Brock at the University of Cambridge and Josephine Pemberton at the University of Edinburgh, she studied evolutionary processes in red deer. During this position, she started to appreciate the power of long-term wild animal population studies in understanding evolutionary ecology and quantitative genetics.

== Career achievements ==
In 2000, Kruuk held a Royal Society University Research Fellowship at the University of Edinburgh, and became Professor of Evolutionary Ecology in 2009. She moved to the Australian National University in 2012. Her research laboratory investigated the influence of climate change on animal populations. Her work there focused on wild vertebrate species, and considered evolution and natural selection in natural populations, effects of ongoing environmental change, quantitative genetics, inbreeding and inbreeding depression, maternal effects and life history evolution. She was awarded an Australian Research Council Laureate Fellowship in 2020.

In 2021, Kruuk was selected as a Royal Society Research Professor, which allowed her to return to the University of Edinburgh. There she continued research on the Rum red deer project, studying the ecology and evolution of red deer on the Isle of Rum in the Inner Hebrides. She also worked on the St Kilda soay sheep project, as well as contining research on other example species.

In 2021 Kruuk was awarded a European Research Council Advanced grant for her project EVOWILD coordinating research across a number of other groups to increase understanding of evolution in nature.

== Awards and honours ==
- 2023 Fellow of the Royal Society
- 2021 European Research Council Advanced Research Grant
- 2021 Royal Society Research Professor
- 2020 Australian Research Council Laureate Fellowship
- 2018 European Society for Evolutionary Biology President's Award
- 2015 The Genetics Society Mary Lyon Medal
- 2014 Elected member of the European Molecular Biology Organization
- 2012 Australian Research Council Future Fellowship
- 2012 Fellow of the Royal Society of Edinburgh
- 2008 Zoological Society of London Scientific Medal
- 2006 Philip Leverhulme Prize
