= John Butterworth =

John or Jack Butterworth may refer to:

- John-Henry Butterworth (born 1976), American screenwriter
- John Butterworth (minister) (1727–1803), English Baptist minister
- John Butterworth (cricketer) (1905–1941), English cricketer
- Jack Butterworth, Baron Butterworth (1918–2003), British lawyer and first Vice-Chancellor of the University of Warwick
- Jon Butterworth, British physicist
- William John Butterworth (1801–1856), British colonel who governed the Straits Settlements in the 1840s and 1850s
- Mike Butterworth (John Michael Butterworth, 1924–1986), British comic book writer

== See also ==
- Jonathan Butterworth (disambiguation)
