= Gavin Salam =

Theoretical particle physicist

Gavin Salam FRS
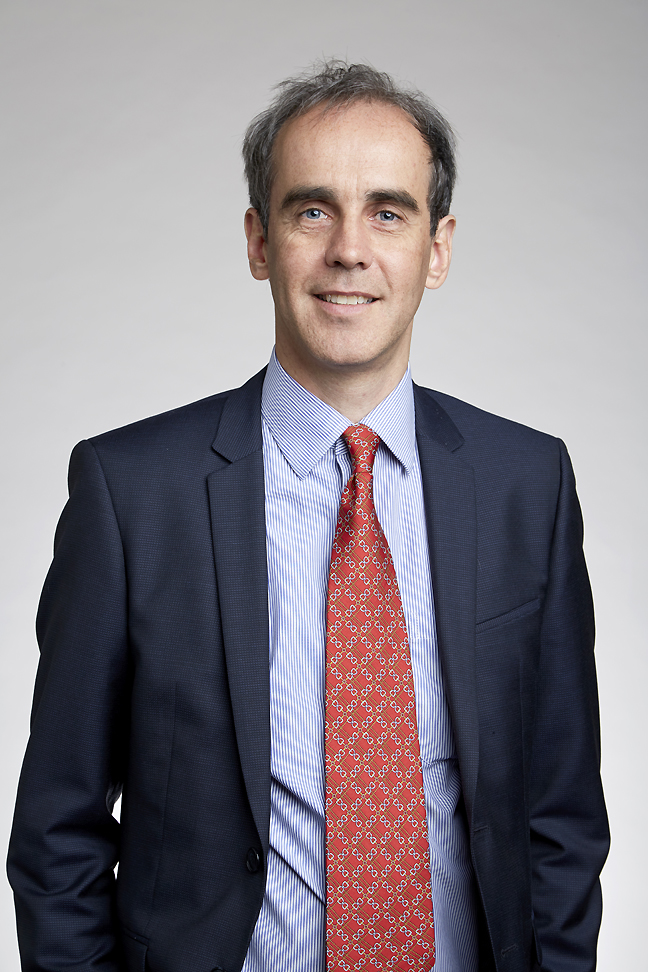
- Gavin Salam at the Royal Society admissions day in London, July 2017
- Born: Gavin Phillip Salam; 1972 or 1973 (age 53–54)
- Education: Lycée Français Charles de Gaulle
- Alma mater: University of Cambridge (BA, PhD)
- Awards: CNRS Silver Medal (2010); Dirac Medal (IOP) (2023)
- Scientific career
- Fields: Theoretical physics
- Institutions: University of Oxford; CERN; CNRS; Princeton University; Pierre and Marie Curie University; Istituto Nazionale di Fisica Nucleare
- Thesis: Quarkonium scattering at high energies (1996)
- Website: cern.ch/gsalam

Gavin Phillip Salam, FRS is a theoretical particle physicist, who works as a Royal Society Research Professor at the University of Oxford and a senior research fellow at All Souls College. His research investigates the strong interaction of Quantum Chromodynamics (QCD), the theory of quarks and gluons. Gavin Salam is not related to Abdus Salam.

== Education ==
Salam was educated at the Lycée Français Charles de Gaulle in London and the University of Cambridge where he was awarded a Bachelor of Arts degree in 1993 followed by a PhD in particle physics in 1996. His doctoral thesis was titled "Quarkonium scattering at high energies". During his postgraduate study he was based in the Cavendish Laboratory where his research investigated the scattering of Quarkonium funded by the Particle Physics and Astronomy Research Council (PPARC).

== Research and career ==
Salam's research explores the ways in which QCD can be exploited to understand elementary particle interactions, notably the Higgs boson, and also how it can be harnessed in the search for new particles. He has made significant contributions to the understanding of the structure of the proton and of jets (cones of hadrons), the signatures of quarks and gluons produced in high-energy collisions. He invented the most widely used approach for identifying jets at the Large Hadron Collider.

Before working at Oxford, Salam was senior member of staff at CERN in Geneva and has also held appointments at Princeton University in the United States, the Istituto Nazionale di Fisica Nucleare (INFN) in Milan., and the Centre national de la recherche scientifique (CNRS) which he joined in 2000, in the Laboratoire de Physique Théorique et Hautes Energies (LPTHE) attached to the Pierre and Marie Curie University in Paris.

Salam appeared with Jon Butterworth in the Science and Technology Facilities Council (STFC) documentary Colliding Particles – Hunting the Higgs, which follows a team of physicists trying to find the Higgs Boson.

=== Awards and honours ===
Salam was elected a Fellow of the Royal Society (FRS) in 2017, awarded the Médaille d'argent (Silver Medal) of the CNRS in 2010, and the IOP Dirac Prize in 2023.
