= Adam Eyre-Walker =

British evolutionary geneticist

Adam Eyre-Walker FRS
- Awards: Balfour Prize; 2002

Academic background
- Education: University of Nottingham; University of Edinburgh
- Thesis: Studies of Synonymous Codon Evolution in Mammals
- Doctoral advisor: William G. Hill

Academic work
- Discipline: Molecular evolution
- Institutions: University of Sussex
- Website: Official website

Adam C. Eyre-Walker is a British evolutionary geneticist, currently Professor of Biology (Evolution, Behaviour and Environment) in the School of Life Sciences at the University of Sussex. He is noted for making "significant contributions to our understanding of evolution at the molecular level" and pioneering the use of DNA sequence databases for extracting information about the evolution of genomes.

== Early life and career ==
Eyre-Walker took his B.Sc. at the University of Nottingham and Ph.D. at the University of Edinburgh. His doctoral thesis, submitted in 1992, was titled Studies of Synonymous Codon Evolution in Mammals and supervised by William G. Hill. Eyre-Walker joined the University of Sussex in 1997.

== Scientific research ==
His research focuses on molecular and genome evolution, and studies the rate, pattern and effects of genetic mutations through the statistical analysis of DNA sequences and mathematical modeling from an evolutionary perspective. According to Eyre-Walker: "One of the central mysteries of evolution is how much of it is due to adaptive evolution at the molecular level. I have devoted much of my career in one way or another to answering this question and those related to it. It seems that adaptive evolution has a major role to play in many species, but we are far from understanding the full picture."

=== Research on the scientific process ===
In 2013, with Nina Stoletzki, Eyre-Walker published research arguing that scientists are poor at assessing one another's work: "... scientists have little ability to judge either the intrinsic merit of a paper or its likely impact....the number of citations a paper receives is an extremely error-prone measure of scientific merit.... [and] impact factor is likely to be a poor measure of merit, since it depends on subjective assessment". He concluded: "Scientists are probably the best judges of science, but they are pretty bad at it".

Two years later, Eyre-Walker and colleagues Isabelle Cook and Sam Grange researched the optimal size and structure of scientific laboratories. By analyzing data from almost 400 different laboratories, they reported that the bigger the lab, the more productive it is (measured in number of publications, impact factor of the journals in which group members publish papers, and number of citations).

== Achievements and awards ==
Eyre-Walker won the 2002 Balfour Prize from the Genetics Society and earned the President's award from the European Society for Evolutionary Biology in 2012. He was elected a Fellow of the Royal Society in 2020.

== Selected publications ==
- Hodgkinson, Alan; Eyre-Walker, Adam (4 October 2011). "Variation in the mutation rate across mammalian genomes". Nature Reviews Genetics. 12 (11): 756–766. doi:10.1038/nrg3098. eISSN 1471-0064. ISSN 1471-0056. PMID 21969038. S2CID 7466314.
- Eyre-Walker, Adam; Keightley, Peter D. (August 2007). "The distribution of fitness effects of new mutations". Nature Reviews Genetics. 8 (8): 610–618. doi:10.1038/nrg2146. eISSN 1471-0064. ISSN 1471-0056. PMID 17637733. S2CID 10868777.
- Smith, Nick G. C.; Eyre-Walker, Adam (February 2002). "Adaptive protein evolution in Drosophila". Nature. 415 (6875): 1022–1024. doi:10.1038/4151022a. eISSN 1476-4687. ISSN 0028-0836. PMID 11875568. S2CID 4426258.
- Eyre-Walker, Adam; Keightley, Peter D. (January 1999). "High genomic deleterious mutation rates in hominids". Nature. 397 (6717): 344–347. Bibcode:1999Natur.397..344E. doi:10.1038/16915. eISSN 1476-4687. ISSN 0028-0836. PMID 9950425. S2CID 4314159.
- Eyre-Walker, Adam; Stoletzki, Nina (8 October 2013). "The Assessment of Science: The Relative Merits of Post-Publication Review, the Impact Factor, and the Number of Citations". PLOS Biology. 11 (10) e1001675. doi:10.1371/journal.pbio.1001675. eISSN 1545-7885. PMC 3792863. PMID 24115908.
