= Jonathan Butterworth =

Jonathan Butterworth may refer to:

- Jon Butterworth, physicist at UCL
- Jon-Allan Butterworth, cyclist born 1966

== See also ==
- John Butterworth (disambiguation)
