= Robin Allshire =

British academic

Professor Robin Allshire FRS FRSE FMedSci
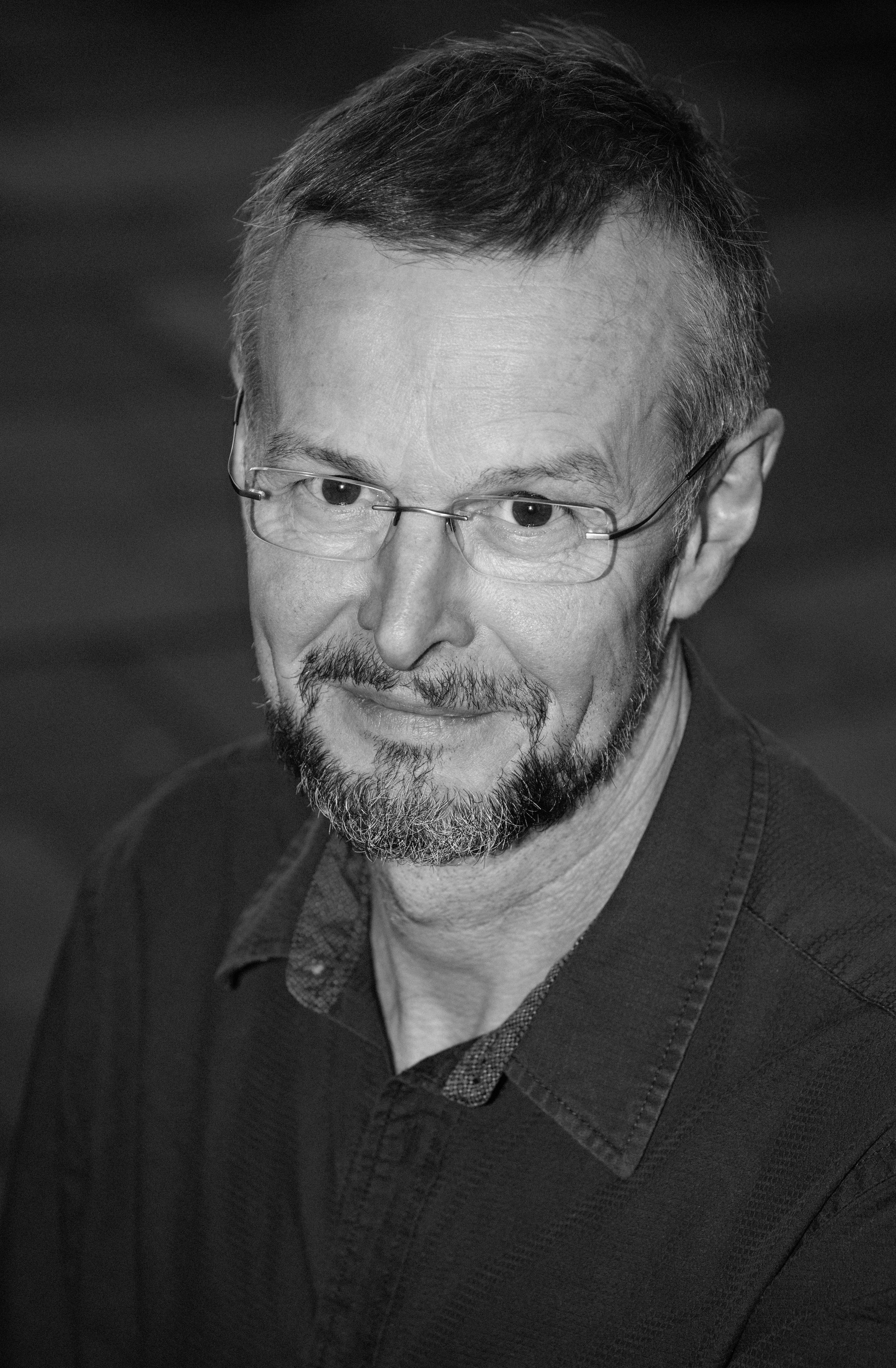
- Robin Allshire in 2019
- Born: Robin Campbell Allshire; 1960 (age 65–66)
- Education: Trinity College Dublin (BSc); University of Edinburgh (PhD)
- Scientific career
- Fields: Epigenetics; Heterochromatin; Chromatin; Centromere; Kinetochore
- Institutions: University of Edinburgh; Cold Spring Harbor Laboratory
- Thesis: Construction and analysis of vectors based on bovine papilloma virus (1985)
- Doctoral advisor: Chris Bostock; Edwin Southern
- Other academic advisors: Nicholas Hastie
- Website: allshirelab.com

Robin Campbell Allshire (born 19 May 1960) is a British academic who is Professor of Chromosome Biology at University of Edinburgh and a Wellcome Trust Principal Research Fellow. His research group at the Wellcome Trust Centre for Cell Biology focuses on the epigenetic mechanisms governing the assembly of specialised domains of chromatin and their transmission through cell division.

== Early life and education ==
Allshire grew up in the fishing village of Howth, Co Dublin 1960–1978. His parents were Arthur Gordon Allshire (1925-2012) who was a Pharmacist and Freda Margaret (née Schmutz; 1933–2014). He was awarded his Bachelor of Arts degree in Genetics by Trinity College Dublin, in 1981 where he was motivated by the inspirational teaching of David McConnell and colleagues at the Dept of Genetics to undertake post-graduate studies. He subsequently joined the Medical Research Council (MRC) Mammalian Genome Unit at the University of Edinburgh where he obtained his PhD in 1985 under the guidance of Chris Bostock and Edwin Southern investigating the use of bovine papillomavirus as a chassis for mammalian artificial chromosome construction.

== Career and research ==
In 1985 Allshire joined Nicholas Hastie's research group at the MRC Human Genetics Unit, Edinburgh (formerly MRC Clinical and Population Cytogentics Unit) as a postdoctoral researcher where he discovered that mammalian telomeres are composed of simple repetitive sequences similar to those of unicellular eukaryotes and that telomere length in blood cells shorten with age and are further eroded in cancerous cells. This work resulted from following the fate of fission yeast (Schizosaccharomyces pombe) telomeres after introdroducing fission yeast chromosomes into mouse cell in collaboration with Peter Fantes. In 1989 he took a position as an independent visiting scientist at Cold Spring Harbor Laboratory (CSHL) for 18 months before joining the MRC Human Genetics Unit as a junior group leader. While at CSHL he decided to switch his focus to investigating chromosomal elements in the genetically tractable fission yeast. At the MRC HGU, Edinburgh (1990 - 2002), and subsequently at the Wellome Trust Centre for Cell Biology, University of Edinburgh (2002–present), he discovered that genes are silenced when placed within fission yeast centromeres and telomeres, and then utilised this gene silencing to gain fundamental insights into the processes of chromosome segregation, and heterochromatin and kinetochore CENP-A chromatin establishment and maintenance. He is particularly interested in the epigenetic mechanisms that allow the persistence of specialised chromatin domains through multiple cell divisions and meiosis. He has investigated how RNA interference (RNAi) mediates heterochromatin formation and shown that splicing factors contribute to heterochromatin integrity via siRNA generation and RNAi. He has provided insight into how transcription and resulting non-coding RNA might influence the assembly of specialised CENP-A chromatin and demonstrated that some acts of lncRNA transcription are responsive to environmental stimuli and regulate neighbouring genes by transcriptional interference. Recently using fission yeast his team discovered an epigenetic mechanism that allows fungi to develop resistance to antifungal drugs without alterations to their DNA. This finding is important for understanding how pathogenic fungi become resistant to the limited number of available antifungal agents in both clinical and agricultural arenas.

=== Awards and honours ===
Allshire was elected a Fellow of the Royal Society of Edinburgh in 2005, a Fellow of the Royal Society (FRS) in 2011 and a Fellow of the Academy of Medical Sciences (FMedSci) in 2020.

- 2013 Genetics Society Medal
