= List of fellows of the Royal Society elected in 2017 =

This article lists people who were elected Fellow of the Royal Society in 2017.

== Fellows ==
1. Yves-Alain Barde
2. Tony Bell
3. Christopher Bishop
4. Neil Burgess
5. Keith Beven
6. Wendy Bickmore
7. Krishna Chatterjee
8. James R. Durrant
9. Warren East
10. Tim Elliott
11. Anne Ferguson-Smith
12. Jonathan M. Gregory
13. Mark Gross
14. Roy M. Harrison
15. Gabriele C. Hegerl
16. Edward C. Holmes
17. Richard Houlston
18. E. Yvonne Jones
19. Subhash Khot
20. Julia King, Baroness Brown of Cambridge
21. Stafford Lightman
22. Yadvinder Malhi
23. Andrew N. J. McKenzie
24. Gerard J. Milburn
25. Anne Neville
26. Alison Noble
27. Andrew Orr-Ewing
28. David J. Owen
29. Lawrence Paulson
30. Josephine Pemberton
31. Sandu Popescu
32. Sarah (Sally) Price
33. Anne Ridley
34. David C. Rubinsztein
35. Gavin Salam
36. Nigel Shadbolt
37. Angus Silver
38. Gordon Douglas Slade
39. Jennifer Thomas
40. Peter Smith
41. Nicola Spaldin
42. Jonathan P. Stoye
43. John Sutherland
44. J. Roy Taylor
45. Patrick Vallance
46. Susanne von Caemmerer
47. Hugh Christian Watkins
48. Roger L. Williams
49. Kenneth H. Wolfe
50. Andrew W. Woods
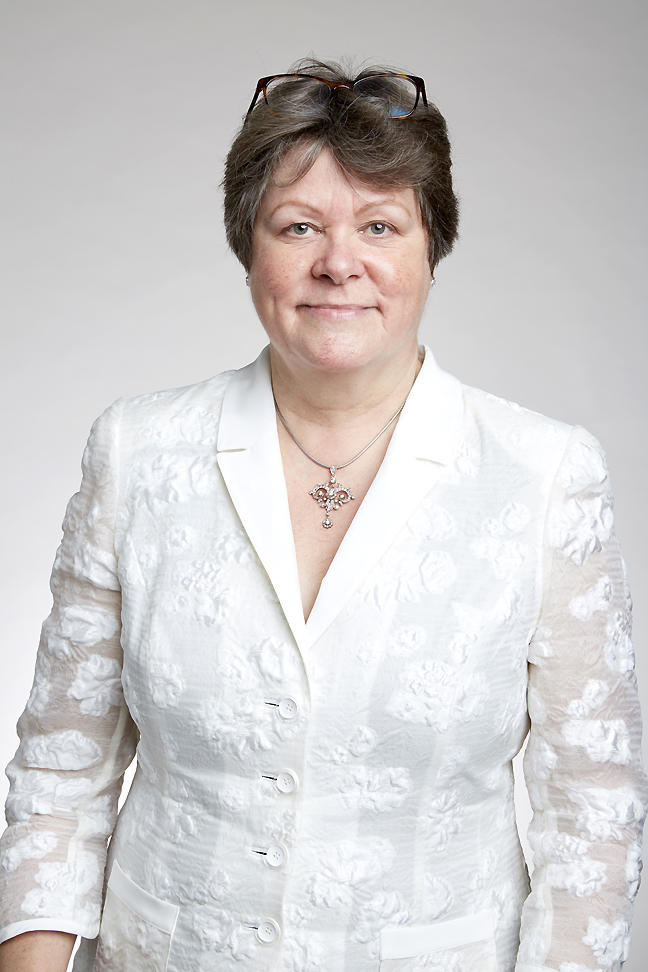
Julia King, Baroness Brown of Cambridge FRS

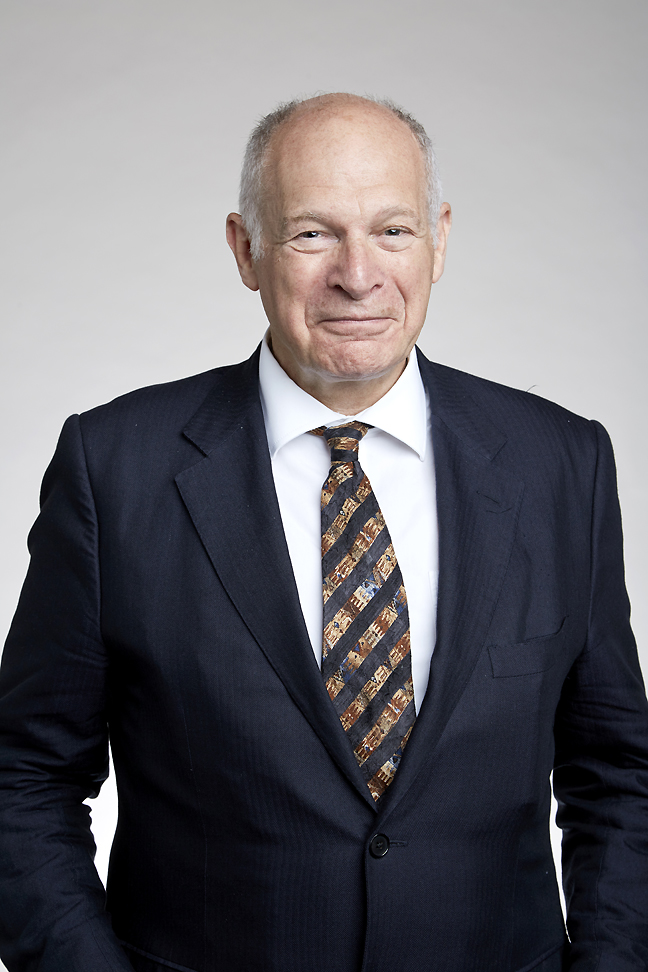
David Neuberger, Baron Neuberger of Abbotsbury HonFRS

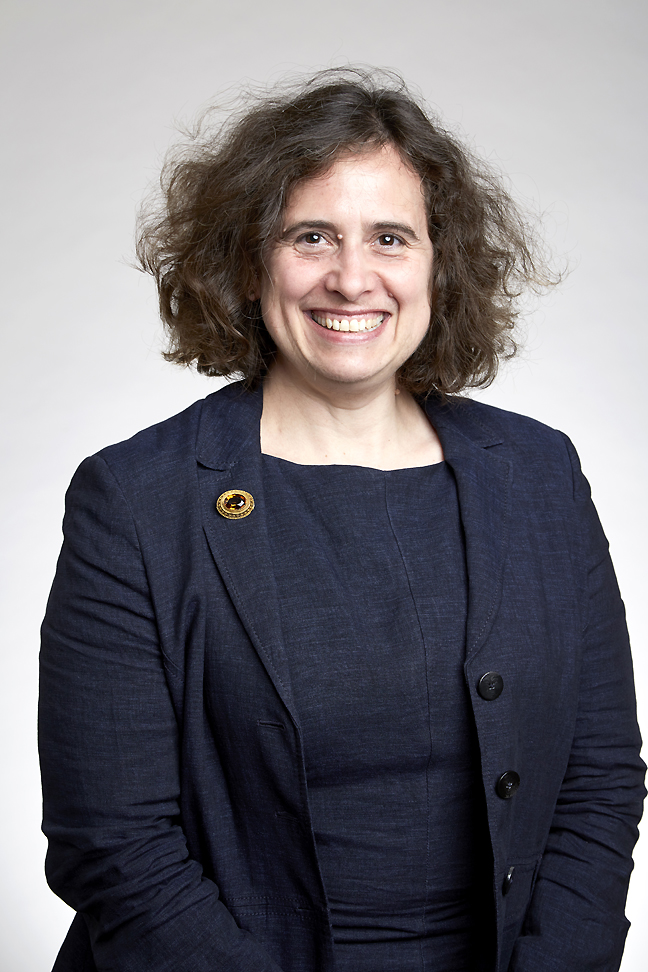
Anne Ferguson-Smith FRS

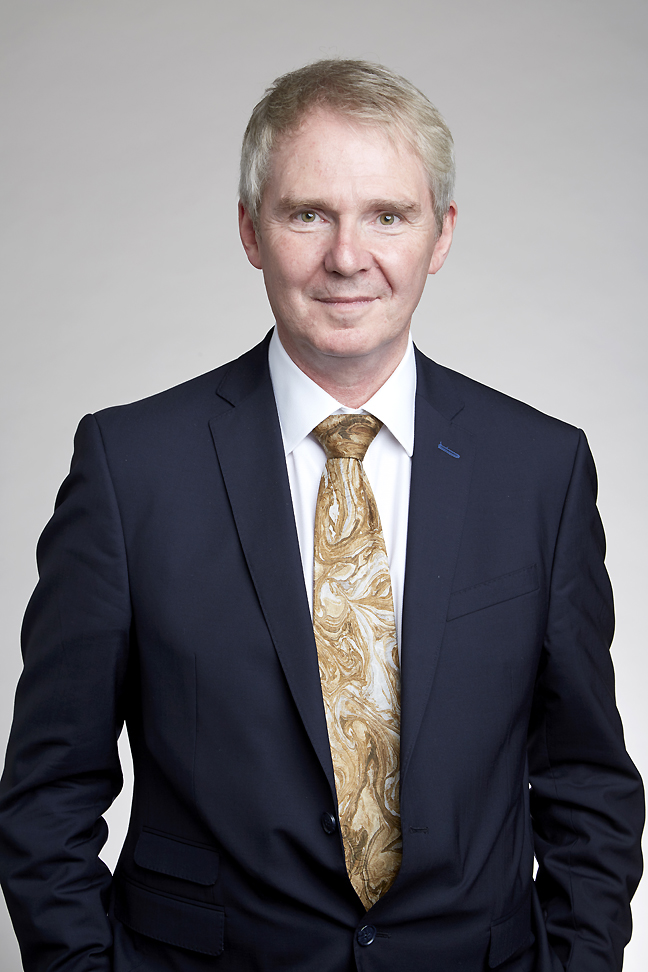
Nigel Shadbolt FRS

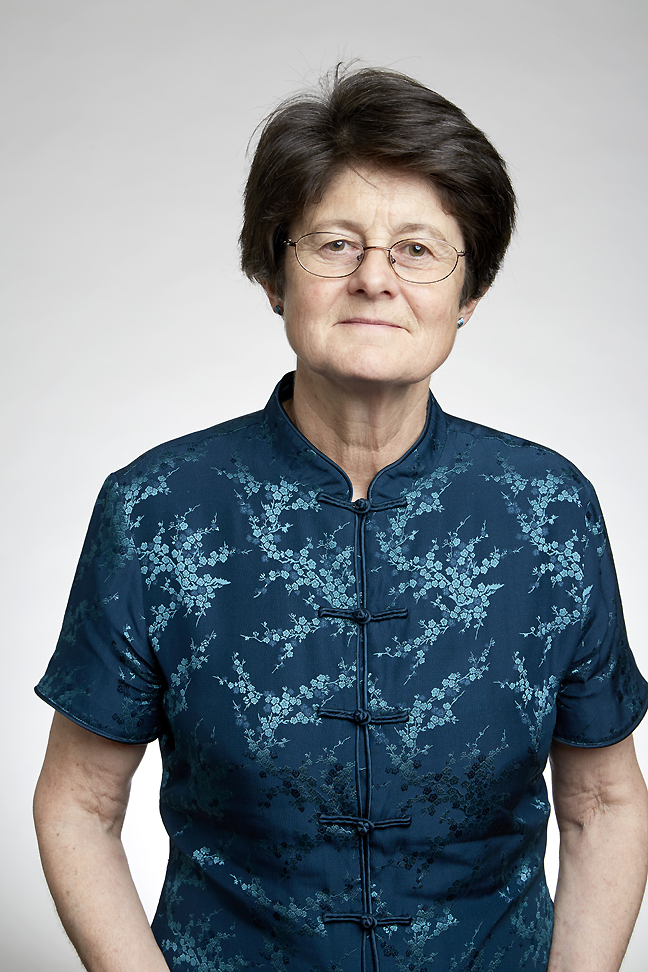
Josephine Pemberton FRS

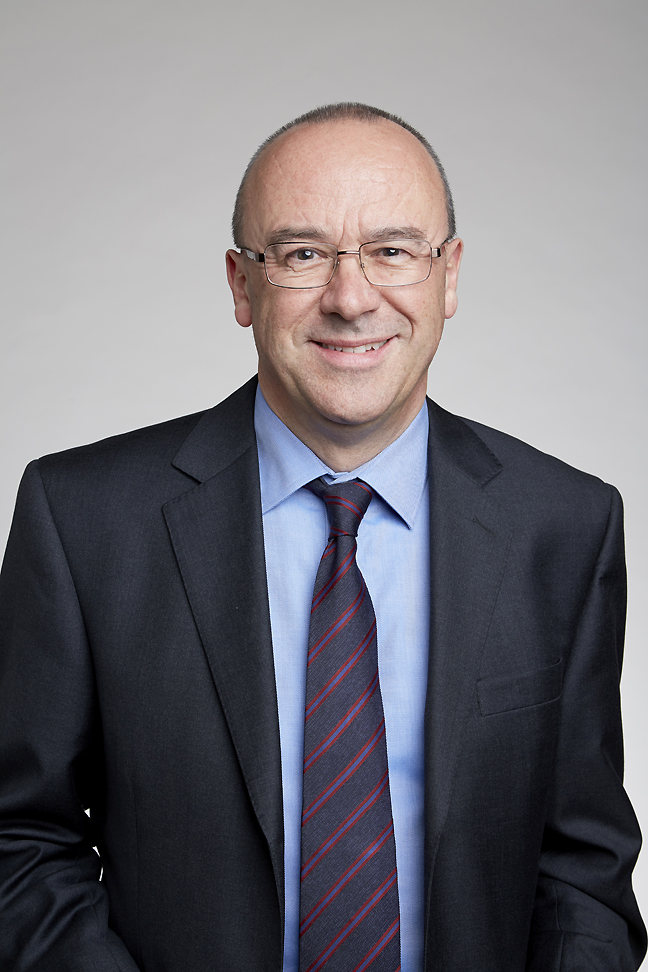
Christopher Bishop FRS

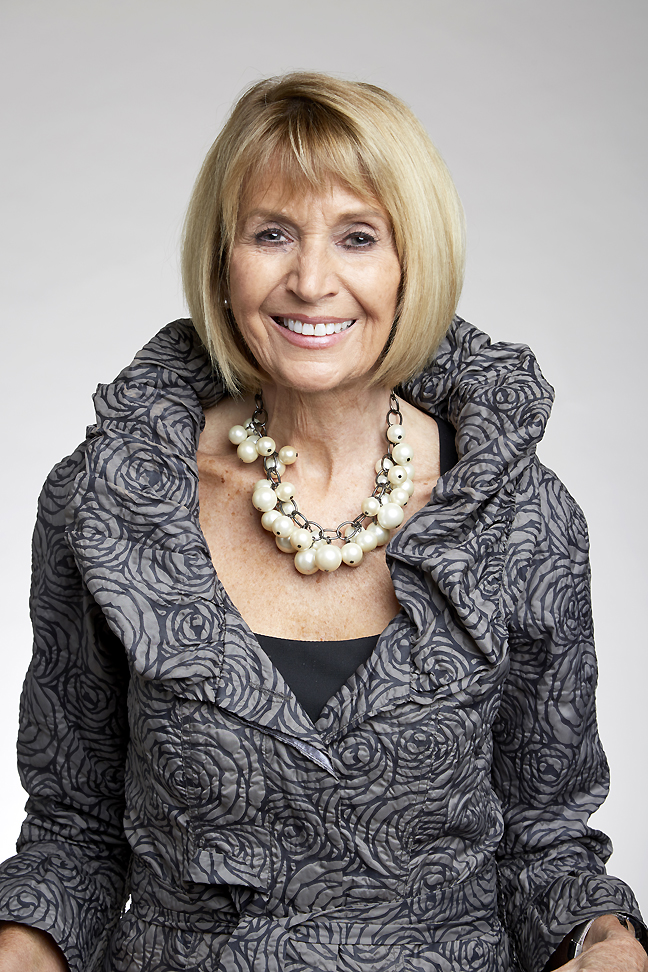
Marcia McNutt ForMemRS

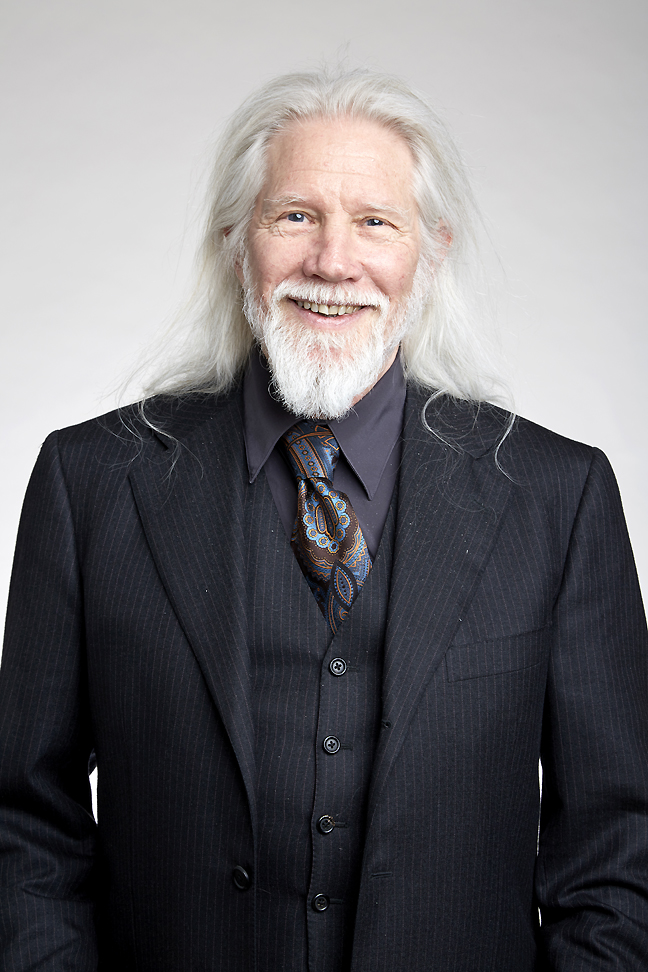
Whitfield Diffie ForMemRS

== Honorary fellows ==
1. David Neuberger, Baron Neuberger of Abbotsbury

== Foreign members ==
1. Max Dale Cooper
2. Whitfield Diffie
3. Robert H. Grubbs
4. Hideo Hosono
5. Marcia McNutt
6. Ginés Morata
7. Robert O. Ritchie
8. Thomas C. Südhof
9. G. David Tilman
10. Susan R. Wessler
