= Roger L. Williams =

British structural biologist

Roger L. Williams FRS FMedSci
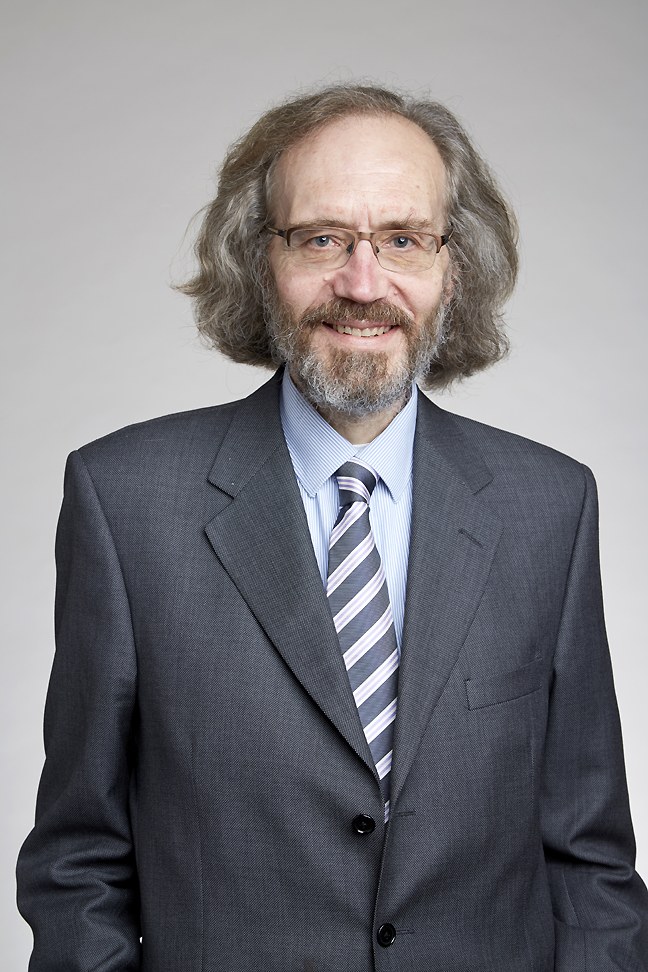
- Williams in 2017
- Education: Purdue University ( Eastern Washington University; University of California Riverside
- Awards: EMBO Member; Morton Lectureship
- Scientific career
- Fields: Structural biology; ESCRT; PI-3K; Phosphoinositide; PIKK
- Workplaces: University of Cambridge; Laboratory of Molecular Biology; Rutgers University; Cornell University; Boris Kidrič Institute, Belgrade
- Thesis: The Structures of Two Ribonuclease B containing Crystals (1986)
- Website: www2.mrc-lmb.cam.ac.uk/group-leaders/t-to-z/roger-williams/

Roger Lee Williams is a British structural biologist who is group leader at the Medical Research Council (MRC) Laboratory of Molecular Biology. His group studies the form and flexibility of protein complexes that associate with and modify lipid cell membranes. His work concerns the biochemistry, structures and dynamics of these key enzyme complexes.

== Education ==
Williams was educated at Purdue University (BS) and Eastern Washington University (MS). He completed his PhD at the University of California, Riverside in 1986 for research investigating the structure of ribonuclease.

== Research and career ==
The work of Williams group is deciphering mechanisms of activation and inhibition of diverse members of the phosphoinositide 3-kinase (PI3K) enzyme a family of enzymes involved in cell-cell communication, lysosomal sorting, nutrient sensing, cell proliferation and DNA-damage response. Mutations in PI3K signalling pathways are common in human tumours, and the William lab focuses on how they contribute to oncogenesis and how pharmaceuticals can specifically target these pathways. The Williams group has shown how conformational changes in the p110 alpha isoform accompanies its activation on cell membranes, and established that oncogenic mutations activate PI3Ks by mimicking or enhancing these conformational changes. His group is uncovering structural and dynamic features that dictate the extreme sensitivity of PI3K complexes to membrane lipid packing and membrane curvature.

His research has funded by Cancer Research UK, the Medical Research Council, AstraZeneca, the Biotechnology and Biological Sciences Research Council (BBSRC), the Wellcome Trust, the National Institute of Diabetes and Digestive and Kidney Diseases, the National Institute of General Medical Sciences and the British Heart Foundation.

Before working at the MRC-LMB, Williams held appointments at Rutgers University, Cornell University and the Boris Kidrič Institute in Belgrade, Serbia.

=== Awards and honours ===
Williams is a member of European Molecular Biology Organization and Fellow of the Academy of Medical Sciences (FMedSci). He was awarded the Morton Lectureship by the Biochemical Society and was elected a Fellow of the Royal Society (FRS) in 2017.
