= Roy M. Harrison =

British environmental chemist (born 1948)

Roy Harrison OBE FRS FRSC FRMetS
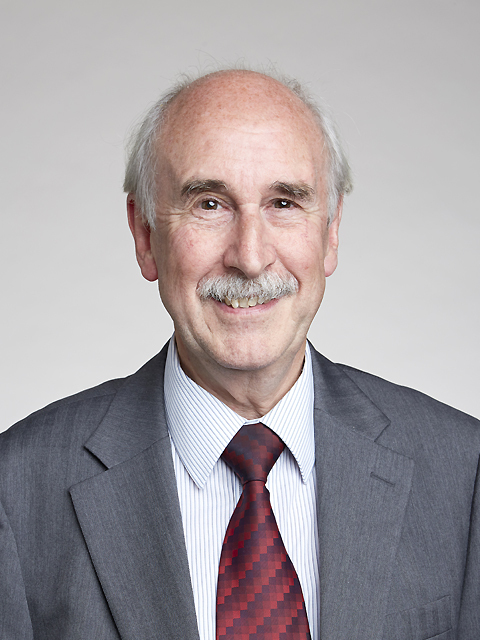
- Harrison in 2017
- Born: 14 October 1948 (age 77)
- Education: University of Birmingham
- Spouses: Angela Copeman (m. 1981, divorced) Susan Sturt (m. 1989)
- Children: 3
- Awards: John Jeyes Medal
- Scientific career
- Fields: Air pollution; Environmental chemistry; Aerosol science; Environmental health; Atmospheric science
- Workplaces: University of Birmingham; King Abdulaziz University; Imperial College London; Lancaster University; University of Essex
- Thesis: Sigmatropic rearrangements of tropolone ethers (1972)
- Website: www.birmingham.ac.uk/staff/profiles/gees/harrison-roy.aspx

Roy Michael Harrison (born 14 October 1948) is a British environmental scientist. He has been Queen Elizabeth II Birmingham Centenary Professor of Environmental Health at the University of Birmingham since 1991, and is a distinguished adjunct professor at King Abdulaziz University in Jeddah, Saudi Arabia.

== Early life and education ==
Roy Michael Harrison was born on 14 October 1948 to Wilfred and Rosa Harrison (née Cotton). He was educated at Henley Grammar School and the University of Birmingham, where he was awarded a Bachelor of Science degree in chemistry in 1969, followed by a PhD in organic chemistry in 1972 and a Doctor of Science degree in environmental chemistry in 1989. His PhD research investigated sigmatropic reactions of tropolone ethers.

== Research and career ==
Harrison is an expert on air pollution, specialising in the area of airborne particulates, including nanoparticles. His interests extend from source emissions, through atmospheric chemical and physical transformations, to human exposures and effects upon health. His most significant work has been in the field of vehicle emitted particles, including their chemical composition and atmospheric processing. This forms the basis of the current understanding of the relationship of emissions to roadside concentrations and size distributions.

In addition to leading a large project on diesel exhaust particles, he is also engaged in major collaborative studies of processes determining air quality in Beijing and Delhi.

=== Awards and honours ===
Harrison's work has been recognised by award of the John Jeyes Medal and Environment Prize of the Royal Society of Chemistry and the Fitzroy Prize of the Royal Meteorological Society. He has served for many years as a chair and/or member of advisory committees of the Department for Environment, Food and Rural Affairs (Defra) and the Department of Health. He was appointed Order of the British Empire OBE in the 2004 New Year Honours for services to environmental science and elected a Fellow of the Royal Society (FRS) in 2017.

== Personal life ==
Harrison married Angela Copeman in 1981. After their divorce, he married Susan Sturt in 1989. Harrison has a son and a daughter from his first marriage, and a son from his second. He enjoys "mowing and other outdoor pursuits".
