= Thrust (particle physics) =

Variable quantifying the coherence of jets

In high energy physics, thrust is a property, (one of the event shape observables) used to characterize the collision of high energy particles in a collider.

When two high energy particles collide, they typically produce jets of secondary particles. This happens when one or several quark-antiquark pairs are produced during the collision. Each colored quark/antiquark pair travels its separate way and subsequently hadronizes. Many new particles are created by the hadronization process and travel in approximately the same direction as the original pair. This set of particles constitutes a jet.

The thrust quantifies the coherence, or ″jettiness″ of the group of particles resulting from one collision. It is defined as:

$T= \underset{|n|=1}{\operatorname{max}} \bigg[\frac{\sum_i|p_i.n|}{\sum_i|p_i|}\bigg]$,

where $p_i$ is the momentum of particle $i$, and $n$ is a unit vector that maximizes $T$ and defines the thrust axis. The sum is over all the final particles resulting from the collision. In practice, the sum may be carried over the detected particles only.

The thrust $T$ is stable under collinear splitting of particles, and therefore it is a robust observable, largely insensitive to the details of the specific hadronization process.
