= Yves-Alain Barde =

Swiss neurobiologist working in Britain

Yves-Alain Barde FRS
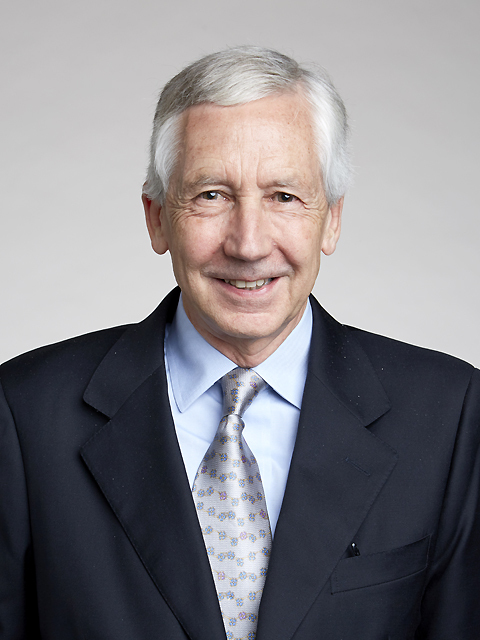
- Barde in 2017
- Education: University of Geneva (PhD)
- Known for: work on Brain-derived neurotrophic factor (BDNF)
- Awards: EMBO Member
- Scientific career
- Workplaces: Cardiff University; University of Basel; Max Planck Institute of Psychiatry
- Thesis: Potassium-induced increase in oxygen consumption of brown adipose tissue from the rat (1975)
- Website: www.cardiff.ac.uk/people/view/81114-barde-yves

Yves-Alain Barde FRS is a professor of Neurobiology at Cardiff University. He was elected a Fellow of the Royal Society (FRS) in 2017.

Barde was awarded the IPSEN prize, the Ameritec Foundation Award and the Perl-UNC Prize. He is a member of the European Molecular Biology Organization and External Member of the Max Planck Institute of Neurobiology.

== Academic publications ==
Barde is the author of hundreds of academic publications which have been cited over 42,000 times according to Google Scholar.

=== Selected works ===
- Physiology of the neurotrophins, GR Lewin, YA Barde, Annual review of neuroscience 19 (1), 289–317, 1996.
- Purification of a new neurotrophic factor from mammalian brain., YA Barde, D Edgar, H Thoenen, The EMBO journal 1 (5), 549–553, 1982.
- Trophic factors and neuronal survival, YA Barde, Neuron 2 (6), 1525–1534, 1989.
