= Jon Butterworth =

Professor of Physics at University College London

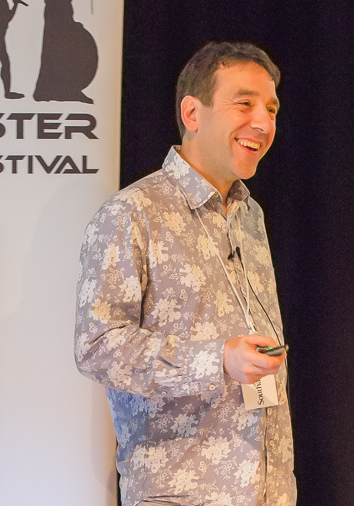
- Jon Butterworth speaking at Winchester Science Festival in 2013
- Born: Jonathan Mark Butterworth; 1967 or 1968 (age 58–59)
- Education: Wright Robinson High School; Shena Simon Sixth Form College; University of Oxford (BA, DPhil)
- Awards: Chadwick Medal and Prize (2013); Royal Society Wolfson Research Merit Award (2009)
- Scientific career
- Fields: Particle physics
- Workplaces: University College London; DESY; Pennsylvania State University
- Thesis: Performance of the ZEUS second level tracking trigger and studies of R-parity violating supersymmetry at HERA (1992)
- Doctoral advisor: Doug Gingrich; Herbi Dreiner
- Website: www.hep.ucl.ac.uk/~jmb/; iris.ucl.ac.uk/research/personal?upi=JMBUT84

Jonathan Mark Butterworth is a professor of physics at University College London (UCL) working on the ATLAS experiment at CERN's Large Hadron Collider (LHC). His popular science book Smashing Physics, which tells the story of the search for the Higgs boson, was published in 2014 and his newspaper column / blog Life and Physics is published by The Guardian.

== Early life and education ==
Butterworth was raised in Manchester and educated at Wright Robinson High School in Gorton and Shena Simon Sixth Form College. He studied physics at the University of Oxford, gaining a Bachelor of Arts degree in 1989 followed by a Doctor of Philosophy in particle physics in 1992. His PhD research used the ZEUS particle detector to investigate R-parity violating supersymmetry at the Hadron-Electron Ring Accelerator (HERA) at the Deutsches Elektronen-Synchrotron (DESY) in Hamburg, and was supervised by Doug Gingrich and Herbert K. Dreiner.

== Research and career ==
After completing his PhD, Butterworth spent three years as a postdoctoral researcher for Pennsylvania State University, primarily working in Hamburg on ZEUS. He joined the Department of Physics & Astronomy at UCL in 1995, serving as head of department from 2011 to 2018, and was appointed Professor of Physics in 2015.

As of 2017 Butterworth works on particle physics, particularly the ATLAS experiment at the Large Hadron Collider at CERN. His research investigates what nature is like at the smallest distances and the highest energies – the fundamental physical laws. This tells us about the physics which was most important in the first few moments after the Big Bang. His research collaborators include Brian Cox and Jeff Forshaw and he has supervised or co-supervised several successful PhD students to completion on the ATLAS experiment, ZEUS and HERA.

Butterworth frequently discusses physics in public, including talks at the Royal Institution and the Wellcome Trust and appearances on Newsnight, Horizon, Channel 4 News, Al Jazeera, and BBC Radio 4's Today Programme and The Infinite Monkey Cage. He appeared with Gavin Salam in the Science and Technology Facilities Council (STFC) documentary Colliding Particles - Hunting the Higgs, which follows a team of physicists trying to find the Higgs Boson.

His research has been funded by the Science and Technology Facilities Council (STFC) and the Royal Society. In 2026 he spoke publicly about the potential impacts of significant funding cuts from STFC in PPAN (Particle Physics, Astronomy and Nuclear Physics) research, including the cancellation of £250 million of planned investment into four major infrastructure projects amid overall annual budget cuts of around 30% (which he described as "catastrophic"), which could lead to hundreds of PhD and postdoctoral positions being cut, affecting the financial viability of physics departments within UK universities. Butterworth later gave evidence to the House of Commons Science, Innovation and Technology Select Committee about the proposed budget cuts, particularly the impact on early-career researchers and on the position and standing of the UK within large international PPAN collaborations, saying "we have international meetings coming up at the end of the month where our name is going to be mud if this is not sorted out".

Butterworth was a member of the STFC Council from April 2021 to March 2025, and has served on the governing council of UCL since 2021. In July 2026, Butterworth was elected President of the Institute of Physics, starting in the role from October 2026.

== Bibliography ==
- Smashing Physics (2014)
- A Map of the Invisible (2017)

== Awards and honours ==
Butterworth was awarded a prestigious Royal Society Wolfson Research Merit Award in 2009 and shortlisted for the Royal Society Winton Prize for Science Books in 2015 for his book Smashing Physics, which was also shortlisted for Book of the Year by Physics World in 2014. He was awarded the James Chadwick Medal and Prize by the Institute of Physics (IOP) in 2013. His citation at the IOP reads:

He made the first measurements of the production of the hadronic 'jets' produced when quarks and gluons scatter in photon-proton collisions, and was Physics Chair of the ZEUS experiment in 2003/2004. He led the first measurement of jets and dijets at the LHC. He coordinated the ATLAS "Standard Model" group for the first two years of data-taking, leading more than fifty papers to publication. He has also made key phenomenological improvements related to the understanding of jets, including multiple-parton interactions, parton densities in the proton and photon, and the substructure of jets. These ideas, especially those on interrogating jet substructure, have been widely used in searches for Physics beyond the Standard Model. For example, for the identification of highly boosted (as a result of being created at very high energies) decays of top quarks, jet substructure studies are essential because frequently the decay products of the top quarks all appear inside the same jet of hadrons. Identification of boosted Higgs bosons has also proved to be the most sensitive way of identifying Higgs decays to b-quarks. He has written several seminal phenomenology papers on these topics. He has also developed several software packages which are very widely used in the simulation, measurement and understanding of high-energy collider data. Butterworth has worked on design, construction and development of the ZEUS and ATLAS detectors and their upgrades, including leading the successful bids in the UK for a microvertex detector upgrade for the ZEUS detector, and the first stage of the ATLAS detector upgrades in the UK.
