= MRC Human Genetics Unit =

Research institute of Edinburgh university

Coordinates: 55°57′45″N 3°13′55″W

- Founded: 1967
- Location: Edinburgh, UK
- Director: Professor W Bickmore
- Website: http://www.ed.ac.uk/mrc-human-genetics-unit

The Medical Research Council (UK) Human Genetics Unit is situated at the Western General Hospital in Edinburgh. It is one of the largest MRC research establishments, housing over two hundred scientists, support staff, research fellows, PhD students, and visiting workers.

== Staff ==
As of 2018 current and former staff at the MRC HGU include:

=== Directors ===
- 1956–1969 Dr Michael Court Brown
- 1969–1994 Professor John Evans
- 1994–2015 Professor Nicholas Hastie
- 2015– Professor Wendy Bickmore

=== Group leaders ===
- Pleasantine Mill
- Chris Ponting
- Wendy Bickmore

== Institute of Genetics and Cancer (IGC) ==
The MRC Human Genetics Unit is based at the Institute of Genetics and Cancer, University of Edinburgh at the site of the Western General Hospital.
