= The Genetics Society =

UK learned society

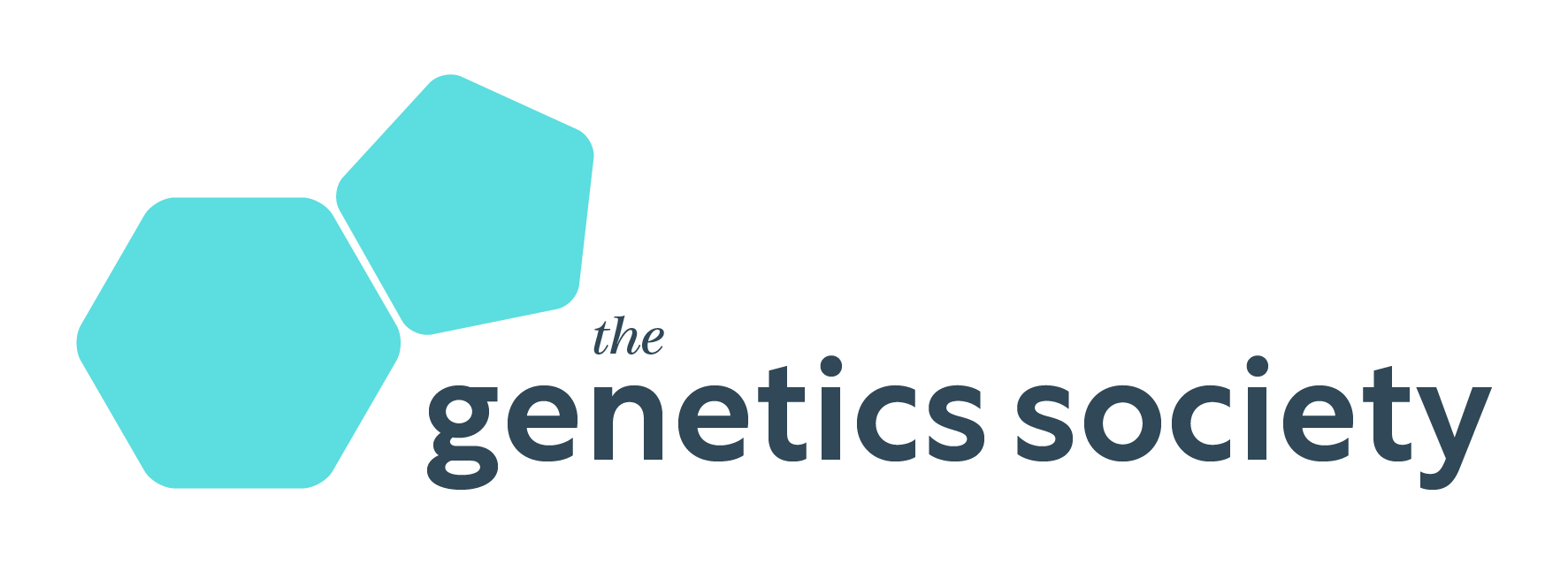
- Formation: 1919
- Type: Learned Society
- Headquarters: 1 Naoroji Street
- Location(s): London, WC1X; United Kingdom
- Region served: United Kingdom
- Members: 2,000+
- Official language: English
- President: Gil McVean
- Website: genetics.org.uk

The Genetics Society is a British learned society. It was founded by William Bateson and Edith Rebecca Saunders in 1919 and celebrated its centenary year in 2019. It is therefore one of the oldest learned societies devoted to genetics. Its membership of over 2000 consists of most of the UK's active professional geneticists, including researchers, teachers and students. Industry and publishing are also represented in the membership.

The Genetics Society is a registered charity that organises scientific meetings to promote current research in genetics and genomics, and publishes primary research in genetics in the journals Heredity and Genes and Development. It supports students to attend meetings, sponsors research through fieldwork grants and student bursaries, and promotes the public understanding of genetics.

== Presidents of The Genetics Society ==
Years	President
2024-present	Gil McVean, FRS FMedSci
2021-2024	Anne Ferguson-Smith, FRS
2018-2021	Laurence Hurst, FRS
2015–2018	Wendy Bickmore, FRS
2012–2015	Enrico Coen, FRS
2009-2012	Veronica van Heyningen, FRS
2006-2009	Brian Charlesworth, FRS
2003-2006	Jonathan Hodgkin, FRS
2000-2003	Linda Partridge, FRS
1997-2000	Michael Ashburner, FRS
1994-1997	David John Sherratt, FRS
1990-1994	Paul Nurse, PRS
1987-1990	Noreen Murray, FRS
1984-1987	David Hopwood, FRS
1981-1984	John L. Jinks, FRS
1978-1981	John Fincham, FRS
1975-1978	John Thoday, FRS
1973-1975	Ralph Riley, FRS
1971-1973	William Hayes, FRS
1968-1971	Dan Lewis FRS
1966-1968	Charlotte Auerbach, FRS
1964-1966	Guido Pontecorvo, FRS
1961-1964	David Catcheside, FRS
1958-1961	CH Waddington, FRS
1955-1958	Lionel Penrose, FRS
1952-1955	Sydney Harland, FRS
1949-1952	Kenneth Mather, FRS
1946-1949	EB Ford, FRS
1943-1946	CD Darlington, FRS
1940-1943	Ronald Fisher, FRS
1938-1940	Francis Albert Eley Crew, FRS
1936-1938	Miss ER Saunders, FRHS
1932-1936	JBS Haldane, FRS
1930-1932	Reginald Punnett, FRS
1919-1930	Arthur Balfour, FRS

== Society publications ==
The society publishes the journal Heredity in association with Nature Publishing Group and the journal Genes & Development in association with Cold Spring Harbor Laboratory Press. It also publishes The Genetics Society Newsletter and the Naked Genetics and Genetics Unzipped (the latter hosted by Kat Arney) podcasts.

== Medals and prizes ==
=== Mendel Medal ===
The Mendel Medal is named after Gregor Mendel (1822–84), famous for his experiments on heredity in peas and founder of genetics as a scientific discipline. The Mendel Medal is awarded by the President of the Genetics Society, usually twice within the President's term of office, to an individual who has made outstanding contributions to research in any field of genetics.

Year	Recipient
2026	Joe Felsenstein
2023	Caroline Dean
2022	Azim Surani & Davor Solter
2021	Linda Partridge
2019	William G. Hill
2018	Mary-Claire King
2017	David Baulcombe
2015	John Doebley
2013	Stanislas Leibler
2012	Eric Lander
2010	Susan Lindquist
2009	Wen-Hsiung Li
2008	Matthew Meselson
2007	H. Robert Horvitz
2006	David Weatherall
2004	Chris R. Somerville
2003	Mary F. Lyon
2002	Luigi Luca Cavalli-Sforza
2001	Leland H. Hartwell
2000	James Watson
1999	Eric F. Wieschaus
1998	David Hopwood
1998	Charles Weissmann
1997	Elliot Meyerowitz
1994	Seymour Benzer
1992	Christiane Nüsslein-Volhard
1991	Ira Herskowitz
1989	Piotr Słonimski
1987	Alec Jeffreys
1985	John Maynard Smith
1984	Alan Robertson
1981	Walter Bodmer
1979	Guido Pontecorvo
1977	Charlotte Auerbach
1974	Dan Lewis (geneticist)
1972	C. D. Darlington
1970	Sydney Brenner
1968	Max Delbrück
1966	Francis Crick
1965	William Hayes
1962	François Jacob
1960	C. H. Waddington
1958	George Wells Beadle

=== Sir Kenneth Mather Memorial Prize ===
The Sir Kenneth Mather Memorial Prize is awarded jointly by The Genetics Society and The University of Birmingham and rewards a student of any UK University or Research Institution who has shown outstanding performance in the area of quantitative or population genetics.

Academic Year	Recipient	Institute	Joint recipient	Institute
2021/22	Sam Mitchell	University of Edinburgh		
2020/21	Robert Hillary	University of Edinburgh		
2019/20	Rosa Cheesman	King's College London		
2018/19	Gonçalo Faria	University of St. Andrews		
2017/18	Rosina Savisaar	University of Bath		
2016/17	Danag Crysnanto	University of Edinburgh		
2015/16	Jessica King	University of Edinburgh		
2014/15	Robert Power	Wellcome Trust Africa Centre for Population Health		
2013/14	Tom Booker	University of Edinburgh	Simon Martin	University of Cambridge
2012/13	Laura Corbin	Roslin Institute	Xiachi Xin	University of Edinburgh
2011/12	Holly Trochet	University of Edinburgh		
2010/11	Ben Longdon	University of Edinburgh	Gibran Hemani	Roslin Institute
2009/10	Kay Boulton	University of Edinburgh		
2008/09	Kreepa Kooblall	University of Birmingham		
2007/08	Mark Adams	University of Edinburgh		

=== Balfour Lecture ===
The Balfour Lecture, named after the Genetics Society's first president, is an award to mark the contributions to genetics of an outstanding young investigator. The Balfour Lecturer is elected by the Society's Committee on the basis of nominations made by any individual member of the Society. The only conditions are that the recipient of the award must normally have less than 10 years’ postdoctoral research experience at the time of nomination, and that any nomination must be made with the consent of the nominee. Those making nominations must be members of the Genetics Society, but there is no requirement for the nominee to be a member, nor is there any restriction on nationality or residence.

Year	Recipient
2026	Hilary Martin
2025	Nicky Whiffin
2024	Pontus Skoglund
2023	Lucy van Dorp
2022	Sam Behjati
2021	Alison Wright
2020	Sarah Flanagan
2019	Susan Johnston
2018	Ludmil Alexandrov
2017	Andrew J. Wood
2016	Felicity C. Jones
2014	Elizabeth Murchison
2013	Simon Myers
2012	Örjan Carlborg
2011	Mohan Madan Babu
2010	Andrew P Jackson
2009	Matthew Hurles
2008	Daven Presgraves
2007	Miltos Tsiantis
2006	Olivier Voinnet
2005	Mario de Bono
2004	Gilean McVean
2003	Frank Uhlmann
2002	Adam Eyre-Walker
2001	Sally J. Leevers
2000	Daniel G. Bradley
1999	Darren G. Monckton
1998	Colin Stirling
1997	Wendy Bickmore
1996	Robin Allshire
1995	Daniel St Johnston
1994	John Todd
1993	Nick Barton
1992	William R. A. Brown
1991	Philip Ingham
1990	Paul Eggleston
1989	Ian J. Jackson
1988	Enrico Coen

=== Mary Lyon Medal ===
This new award, named after the distinguished geneticist Mary F. Lyon FRS, was established in 2015 to reward outstanding research in genetics to scientists who are in the middle of their research career.

Year	Recipient
2026	Zamin Iqbal
2025	Kathy Niakan
2024	Adele Marston
2023	Cecilia Lindgren
2022	Irene Miguel-Aliaga
2021	Julian Knight
2020	Alastair Wilson
2019	Oliver Pybus
2018	Sarah Teichmann
2017	Petra Hajkova
2016	Duncan Odom
2015	Loeske Kruuk

=== Genetics Society Medal ===
The Genetics Society Medal is an award that recognizes outstanding research contributions to genetics. The Medal recipient, who should still be active in research at the time the Medal is awarded, will be elected annually by the Genetics Society Committee on the basis of nominations made by any individual member of the Society. Those making nominations must be members of the Genetics Society, but there is no requirement for the nominee to be a member, nor any restriction on nationality or residence. Neither current members of the Committee nor those who have retired from office in the past four years may be nominated for the award. The recipient is invited to deliver a lecture at a Genetics Society meeting, where the medal will be awarded, in the year following their election.

Year	Recipient
2026	Richard Durbin
2025	Josephine Pemberton
2024	Rob Martienssen
2023	Douglas Higgs
2022	Robin Lovell-Badge
2021	David Sherratt
2020	Peter Donnelly
2019	Deborah Charlesworth
2018	Michael W. Bevan
2017	Marisa Bartolomei
2016	Ottoline Leyser
2015	Alan Ashworth
2014	Jonathan Flint
2013	Robin Allshire
2012	Stephen West
2011	Jonathan Hodgkin
2010	Laurence Hurst
2009	Steve Brown
2008	Nicholas Hastie
2007	Caroline Dean
2006	Michael Ashburner
2005	Phil Ingham

=== JBS Haldane Lecture ===
The JBS Haldane Lecture, named in honour of the pioneering geneticist and evolutionary biologist J. B. S. Haldane, recognises an individual for outstanding ability to communicate topical subjects in genetics research, widely interpreted, to an interested lay audience. Awards are made annually and are presented at an open lecture given by the awardee.

Year	Recipient
2026	Carola Vinuesa
2025	Gregory Radick
2024	Alison Bentley
2023	Adam Rutherford
2022	Mike Fay
2021	Matthew Cobb
2020	Jonathan Pettitt
2019	Giles Yeo
2018	Turi King
2017	Enrico Coen
2016	Aoife McLysaght
2015	Alison Woollard
2014	Armand Marie Leroi
2013	Mark Henderson

=== Bruce Cattanach Prize ===
The Bruce Cattanach Prize is a 2022 addition to the Society award portfolio and is awarded annually for an outstanding PhD thesis related to the use of non-human in vivo animal models.

Academic Year	Recipient	Institute	Joint recipient	Institute
2026	Robin Journot	Curie Institute		
2025	Janay Fox	McGill University		
2023/24	Matthew Higgs	Cardiff University		
2022	Louisa Zolkiewski	University of Oxford		
