= Pleasantine Mill =

Canadian biologist

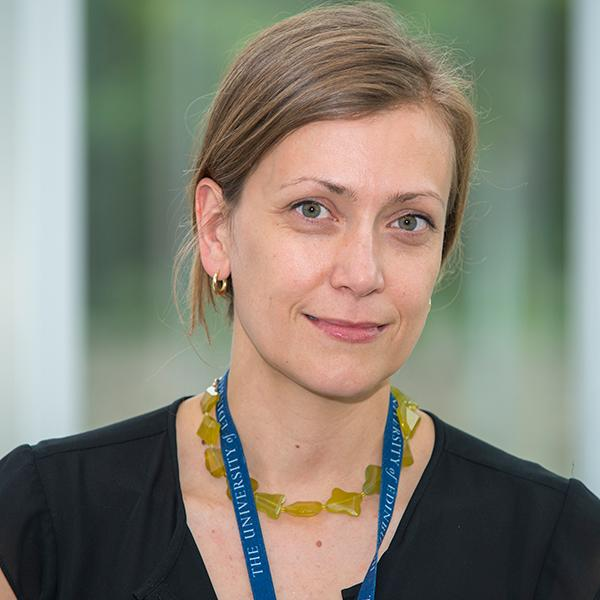
- Mill in 2016
- Education: McGill University (BSc); University of Toronto (PhD)
- Occupations: Developmental and cell biologist
- Scientific career
- Fields: Cilia; Genetics; Disease mechanisms Cell biology Imaging
- Workplaces: University of Edinburgh; The Hospital for Sick Children
- Thesis: The role of Shh-dependent Gli activator and repressor functions in epidermal development and disease (2004)
- Doctoral advisor: Chi-chung Hui
- Website: www.ed.ac.uk/profile/pleasantine-mill

Pleasantine Mill is a cell biologist and group leader at the MRC Human Genetics Unit at the University of Edinburgh. She won the 2018 British Society for Cell Biology Women in Cell Biology Early Career Medal.

== Early life and education ==
Mill completed her bachelor's degree at McGill University in 1999. She joined University of Toronto for her PhD, working on transcription factors in the Hedgehog signaling pathway in skin development and tumorigenesis supervised by Chi-chung Hui. Her work contributed to the book Hedgehog-Gli Signaling in Human Disease. She worked at the Hospital for Sick Children and earned her PhD in 2004.

== Career and research ==
Mill was awarded a Canadian Natural Sciences and Engineering Research Council (NSERC) postdoctoral research fellowship to join the Medical Research Council (MRC) Human Genetics Unit (HGU). She worked on mouse mutagenesis. During her postdoctoral work she identified several novel mutant lines that disrupted developmental signalling. Mill was appointed a Caledonian Research Foundation Fellow at the University of Edinburgh. Since 2014 Mill has established a cilia-focussed programme that uses Small interfering RNA screening. She works with clinical geneticists to understand the molecular phenotypes that underlie ciliopathies in humans. She was awarded a £1.5 million grant from UK Research and Innovation (UKRI) to explore mammalian cilia in development and disease.

Mill examined the influence of the Retinitis pigmentosa GTPase regulator (RPGR) gene on the cells in the eye and how they can cause X-linked retinitis pigmentosa, a condition which causes blindness in middle age. Photoreceptors decay in retinitis pigmentosa patients due to a flaw in the RPGR gene. In 2018 Mill identified a new therapeutic technique for primary ciliary dyskinesia (PCD). She proposed that drugs which make dynein motor proteins functional could improve the quality of life of patients with primary ciliary dyskinesia. In October 2018 Mill chaired the first PCD awareness day. She proposed that the Government of the United Kingdom introduced early genetic diagnosis of PCD for babies with no identified causes of neonatal respiratory distress. She hopes that genome editing will be able to treat PCD. She collaborated with Richard Mort at Lancaster University to develop a fluorescent biosensor that illuminates dividing cilia and cells. The technique allows the study of the interactions between cilia and cells in development, regeneration and disease. It investigates how cilia length and dynamics impact the speed of cell division and tissue development.

=== Awards and honours ===
In 2018 Mill was awarded the British Society for Cell Biology Women in Cell Biology Early Career Medal. In 2025 Mill was awarded the Wolpert Medal from the British Society for Developmental Biology, awarded for outstanding contributions to the communication and teaching of developmental biology.
