= Tim Elliott (geochemist) =

British geochemist

Tim Elliott FRS
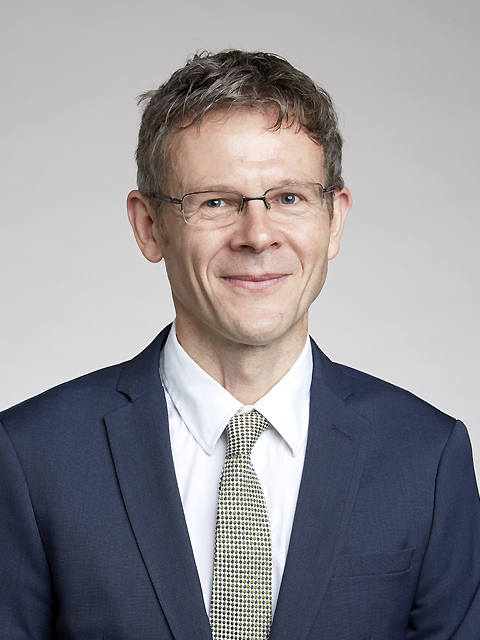
- Elliott in 2017
- Education: University of Cambridge (BA); Open University (PhD)
- Awards: Murchison Medal (2017)
- Scientific career
- Fields: Geochemistry
- Workplaces: University of Bristol
- Thesis: Element fractionation in the petrogenesis of ocean island basalts (1991)
- Website: www.bris.ac.uk/earthsciences/people/tim-r-elliott/index.html

Timothy Richard Elliott FRS is a professor at the University of Bristol.

== Education ==
Timothy Elliot was educated at the University of Cambridge and the Open University where he was awarded a PhD in 1991 for research investigating element fractionation in the petrogenesis of ocean island basalts.

== Career and research ==
Elliott specialises in developing analytical approaches to yield novel isotopic means to reconstruct planetary histories. He has investigated production of melt from the Earth's interior and the chemical consequences of the return of solidified melts to depth via the plate tectonic cycle. In particular, he has assessed elemental fluxes from descending plates and has highlighted how the rise of atmospheric oxygen has been remarkably recorded in the isotopic composition of the deep, solid Earth. His recent focus on planetary growth has identified the rapid formation of metallic cores, how bulk chemistry is notably modified during early accretion and distinctively embellished in its terminal stages.

=== Awards and honours ===
Elliot was awarded the Murchison Medal by the Geological Society of London in 2017 and elected a Fellow of the Royal Society (FRS) in 2017.
