= Andrew N. J. McKenzie =

British molecular biologist

Andrew McKenzie FRS FMedSci
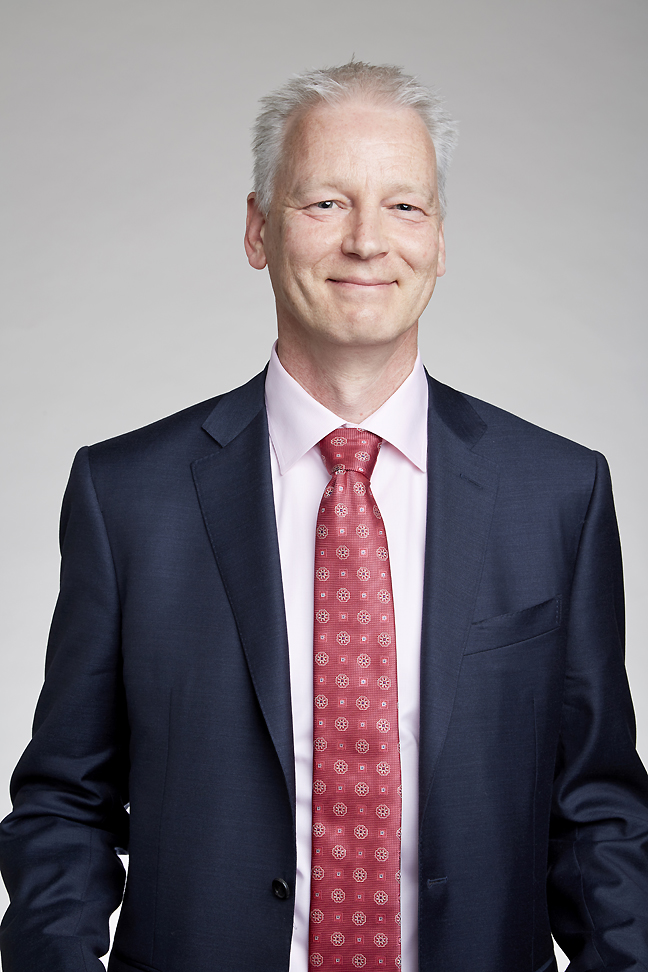
- McKenzie in 2017
- Born: Andrew Neil James McKenzie
- Education: University of London (PhD)
- Scientific career
- Fields: Immunology; Autoimmunity; Molecular biology
- Workplaces: Laboratory of Molecular Biology; University of Cambridge; National Institute for Medical Research
- Thesis: Cellular and humoral aspects of the immune response of the larval stages of Calliphora vomitoria L. (Insecta: Diptera) (1988)
- Website: www2.mrc-lmb.cam.ac.uk/group-leaders/h-to-m/andrew-mckenzie/

Andrew Neil James McKenzie is a British molecular biologist who is a group leader in the Medical Research Council (MRC) Laboratory of Molecular Biology (LMB).

== Education ==
McKenzie was educated at the University of London where he was awarded a PhD for research on the immune response of the bluebottle fly (Calliphora vomitoria), covering both humoral immunity and cell-mediated immunity.

== Research and career ==
McKenzie's research investigates how the innate immune system and adaptive immune system protect the body from infection, but can also lead to inflammation and pathology. He has defined and characterised how biological networks orchestrate responses to pathogens and how dysregulation of these biological pathways can lead to diseases such as asthma and allergy.

His identification of the cytokine Interleukin 13 and the subsequent unearthing of its central role in allergic asthma led to his discovery of type-2 innate lymphoid cells (ILC2). These cells secrete large quantities of cytokines and represent a new druggable biological target for intervention in inflammation and infection.

=== Awards and honours ===
McKenzie was elected a Fellow of the Royal Society (FRS) in 2017 and a Fellow of the Academy of Medical Sciences (FMedSci) in 2011.
