= Bill Hill (geneticist) =

English geneticist and statistician (1940–2021)

Bill Hill OBE FRS FRSE
- Born: William George Hill; 7 August 1940
- Died: 17 December 2021 (aged 81)
- Education: St Albans School
- Alma mater: Wye College (BSc); University of California, Davis (MSc); University of Edinburgh (PhD)
- Awards: 2019 Mendel Medal from the Genetics Society
- Scientific career
- Institutions: University of Edinburgh
- Thesis: Studies on artificial selection (1965)
- Doctoral advisor: Alan Robertson
- Doctoral students: Peter Keightley; Peter Visscher; Adam Eyre-Walker
- Website: www.research.ed.ac.uk/portal/en/persons/william-g-hill(aadaaf9c-71b6-41e0-a64b-97fcc0e4ba92).html

William George Hill (7 August 1940 – 17 December 2021) was an English geneticist and statistician. He was a professor at University of Edinburgh. He is credited as co-discoverer of the Hill–Robertson effect with his doctoral advisor, Alan Robertson.

== Education ==
Hill was educated at St Albans School, Hertfordshire and studied agriculture at Wye College, University of London graduating with a Bachelor of Science degree in 1961. He studied genetics at the University of California, Davis, graduating with a Master of Science degree in 1963, then moved to Edinburgh to pursue a PhD in population genetics with Alan Robertson. His presented thesis was "Studies on artificial selection". He was awarded a Doctor of Science degree in 1976 for research on quantitative genetics.

== Research and career ==
Hill was distinguished for his theoretical contributions to the study of the population and quantitative genetics of finite populations, in particular with respect to multilocus problems. He was the first to present formulae for the expected association of linked genes in finite populations due to random sampling of gametes and for the estimation of these associations from genotype frequencies. He has made major contributions to the analysis of quantitative variation in random breeding populations, both in the design and interpretation of selection experiments and in the analysis of similarity between relatives. He applied these concepts in his own selection experiments in the laboratory and in farm animal improvement programmes.

Hill served as editor in chief of the Proceedings of the Royal Society B from 2005 to 2009.

=== Awards and honours ===
Hill was elected a Fellow of the Royal Society of Edinburgh in 1979, a Fellow of the Royal Society (FRS) in 1985 and appointed OBE in 2004.

In 2018 he was awarded The Royal Society's Darwin Medal for his research in quantitative genetics.

In 2019 he was awarded The Genetics Society's Mendel Medal at The Centenary of Genetics Conference, for his contribution to quantitative genetics.
