= Wendy Bickmore =

British genome biologist (born 1961)

Wendy Bickmore CBE FRS FMedSci FRSE
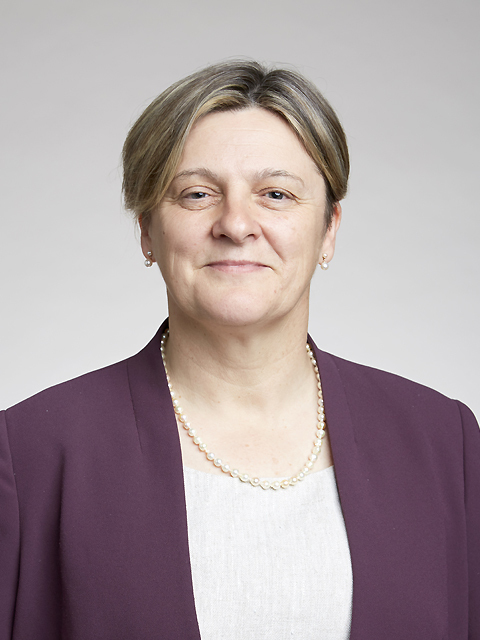
- Bickmore in 2017
- Born: 28 July 1961 (age 65); Shoreham-by-Sea, England
- Education: Chichester High School for Girls; University of Oxford (BA); University of Edinburgh (PhD)
- Awards: EMBO Member (2001)
- Scientific career
- Fields: Genetics; Genomics
- Workplaces: University of Edinburgh; Lister Institute of Preventive Medicine
- Thesis: Molecular analysis of DNA sequences from the human Y chromosome
- Doctoral advisor: Howard Cooke
- Website: ed.ac.uk/mrc-human-genetics-unit/research/bickmore-group

Wendy Anne Bickmore (born 28 July 1961) is a British genome biologist known for her research on the organisation of genomic material in cells.

== Early life and education ==
Bickmore was born at Shoreham-by-Sea on 28 July 1961 to Beryl and Keith Bickmore. She was educated at Chichester High School for Girls where her interest in science began being influenced by her biology teacher and her parents who were keen amateur gardeners. Her interest in biochemistry was confirmed having read 'The Chemistry of Life' by Steven Rose and she went on to study biochemistry at St Hugh's College, Oxford graduating with a BA. She then undertook a PhD at the University of Edinburgh analysing nucleic acid sequences from the Y chromosome of humans. Her supervisors were Howard Cooke and Adrian Bird. She was an independent fellow at the Lister Institute of Preventive Medicine from 1991 until 1996.

== Research and career ==
Her work has focused on how DNA, chromosomes and specific genes are organised and packaged in the cell nucleus, how this process is regulated during development to facilitate the expression of genes, and how aberrant genome organisation is linked to disease.

In 2020, she was recognised for her research examining the likelihood that people will develop serious symptoms of the COVID-19 disease.

Bickmore was president of The Genetics Society from 2015 until 2018.

As of 2021, she is director of the MRC Human Genetics Unit at the University of Edinburgh.

She is a member of the editorial board for Genes & Development.

== Selected publications ==
- Croft, Jenny A.; Bridger, Joanna M.; Boyle, Shelagh; Perry, Paul; Teague, Peter; Bickmore, Wendy A. (14 June 1999). "Differences in the Localization and Morphology of Chromosomes in the Human Nucleus". Journal of Cell Biology. 145 (6): 1119–1131. doi:10.1083/jcb.145.6.1119. ISSN 0021-9525. PMC 2133153. PMID 10366586.
- Fraser, Peter; Bickmore, Wendy (May 2007). "Nuclear organization of the genome and the potential for gene regulation". Nature. 447 (7143): 413–417. Bibcode:2007Natur.447..413F. doi:10.1038/nature05916. ISSN 1476-4687. PMID 17522674. S2CID 4388060.
- Finlan, Lee E.; Sproul, Duncan; Thomson, Inga; Boyle, Shelagh; Kerr, Elizabeth; Perry, Paul; Ylstra, Bauke; Chubb, Jonathan R.; Bickmore, Wendy A. (21 March 2008). "Recruitment to the Nuclear Periphery Can Alter Expression of Genes in Human Cells". PLOS Genetics. 4 (3) e1000039. doi:10.1371/journal.pgen.1000039. ISSN 1553-7404. PMC 2265557. PMID 18369458.

== Awards and honours ==
Bickmore was awarded EMBO Membership in 2001, elected a Fellow of the Royal Society of Edinburgh (FRSE) in 2005 and elected a Fellow of the Academy of Medical Sciences in 2005 (FMedSci). She was elected a Fellow of the Royal Society (FRS) in 2017. She was appointed Commander of the Order of the British Empire (CBE) in the 2021 New Year Honours for services to biomedical sciences and women in science.

== Personal life ==
She is a member of the organisation Trees for Life which is working to restore the forest in the Highlands of Scotland.
