= Kathy Niakan =

Developmental biologist

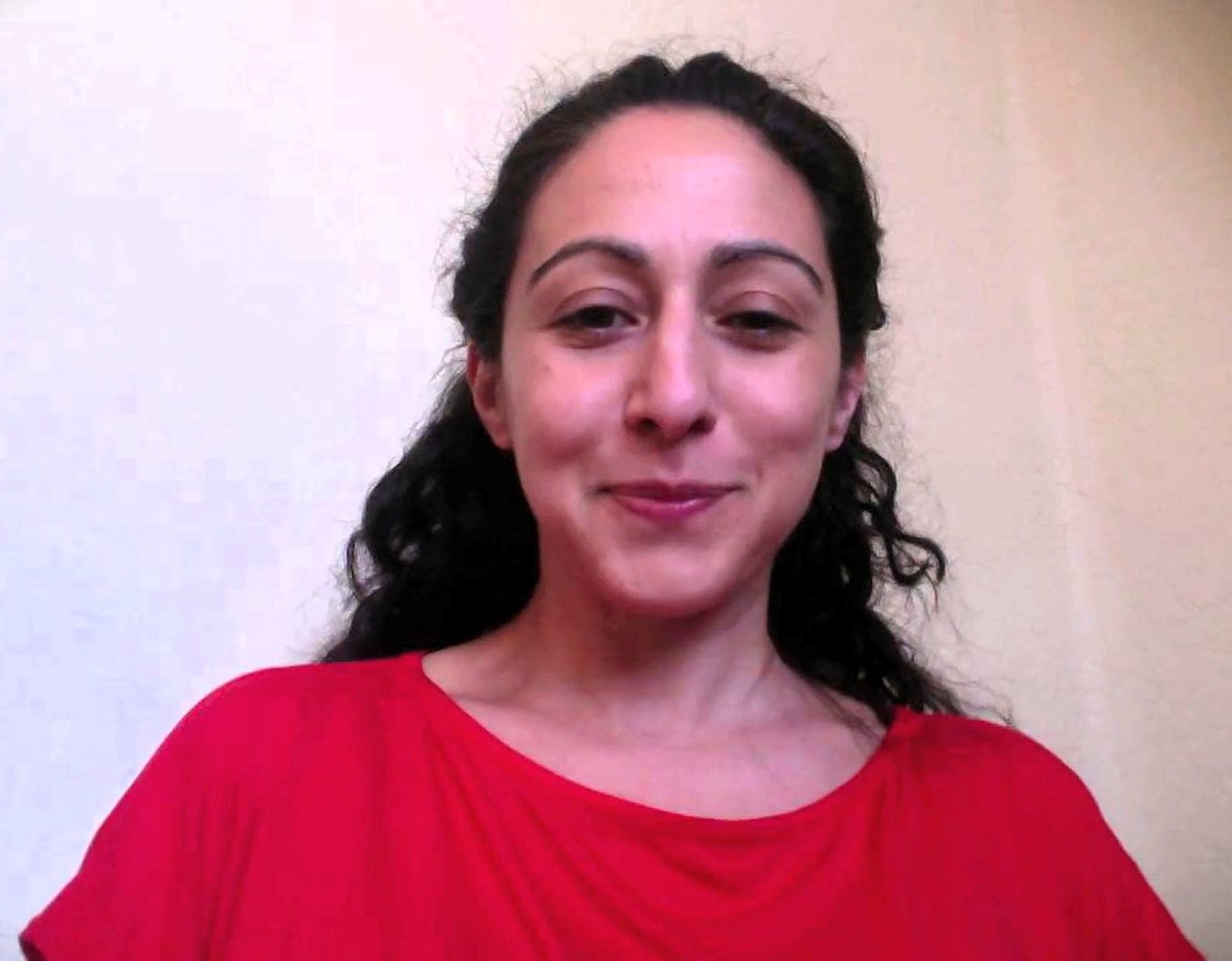
- Niakan as Charles Wright Academy Alum of the Year in 2016
- Born: 1977 (age 48–49); Memphis, Tennessee, USA
- Education: PhD in stem cell research
- Alma mater: University of Washington, University of California, Los Angeles
- Known for: One of the 100 most influential people in the world by Time magazine in April 2016.
- Awards: Mary Lyon Medal (2025)
- Scientific career
- Fields: Stem cell biology
- Institutions: Francis Crick Institute

Kathy Niakan is a developmental biologist, working in human developmental and stem cell biology. In 2016 she became the first scientist in the world to gain regulatory approval to edit the genomes of human embryos for research.

Niakan was named as one of the 100 most influential people in the world by Time magazine in April 2016.

== Biography ==
Kathy Niakan obtained a BSc in cell and molecular biology and a BA in English literature from the University of Washington. In 2005, Niakan obtained her PhD in stem cell and developmental biology from the University of California, Los Angeles, where she worked in the laboratory of Edward McCabe. She went on to be a research fellow with Kevin Eggan at Harvard University, working with human and mouse stem cells to study human embryogenesis and cell potency. She then moved to the University of Cambridge Anne McLaren Laboratory for Stem Cell Biology in the Cambridge Biomedical Campus where she continued to investigate the molecular basis of early cell development in humans and mice. In 2013, Niakan became a group leader at the MRC National Institute for Medical Research (NIMR) in London. Since 2015, she has been a group leader at the Francis Crick Institute, the successor institute to the NIMR.

She was a finalist in the inaugural UK Blavatnik Awards for Young Scientists in 2019.

In 2021, Professor Kathy Niakan was appointed as an honorary group leader in the Epigenetics research program as part of the Babraham Institute, the third person appointed to such a position.

Niakan was awarded the Mary Lyon Medal by The Genetics Society in 2025.

== Research ==
At the Francis Crick Institute, Niakan is investigating the mechanisms of lineage specification in human embryos and stem cells.

In February 2016, Niakan was given the go-ahead by the UK Human Fertilisation and Embryology Authority to genetically modify human embryos. The embryos were to be destroyed after seven days. She planned to use the CRISPR technique to answer questions like what genetic faults cause some women to miscarry, what causes infertility and what is crucial for a healthy embryo. In 2017 her lab published the first major study using CRISPR-Cas9 in human embryos in Nature, demonstrating that the transcription factor Oct4 is essential for fetal development.

In addition to her research, Niakan has engaged with policy makers, funders and the public to provide expert advice on genome editing.
