= Pseudorapidity =

Spatial coordinate used in experimental particle physics

Pseudorapidity values shown on a polar plot. In particle physics, an angle of zero is usually along the beam axis, and thus particles with high pseudorapidity values are generally lost, escaping through the space in the detector along with the beam.

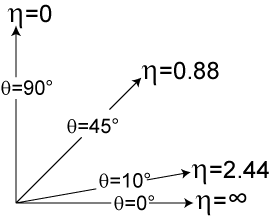
As polar angle approaches zero, pseudorapidity tends towards infinity.

In experimental particle physics, pseudorapidity, $\eta$, is a commonly used spatial coordinate representing the angle of a particle relative to the beam axis. It is defined as

$$\eta \equiv -\ln\left[\tan\left(\frac{\theta}{2}\right)\right],$$

where $\theta$ is the angle between the particle three-momentum $\mathbf{p}$ and the positive direction of the beam axis. Inversely,

$$\theta = 2\arctan\left(e^{-\eta}\right).$$

As a function of three-momentum $\mathbf{p}$, pseudorapidity can be written as

$$\eta = \frac{1}{2} \ln \left(\frac{\left|\mathbf{p}\right|+p_\text{L}}{\left|\mathbf{p}\right|-p_\text{L}}\right) = \operatorname{artanh}\left(\frac{p_\text{L}} {\left|\mathbf{p}\right|}\right),$$

where $p_\text{L}$ is the component of the momentum along the beam axis (i.e. the longitudinal momentum – using the conventional system of coordinates for hadron collider physics, this is also commonly denoted $p_z$).

In hadron collider physics, the rapidity (or pseudorapidity) is preferred over the polar angle $\theta$ because, loosely speaking, particle production is constant as a function of rapidity, and because differences in rapidity are Lorentz invariant under boosts along the longitudinal axis: they transform additively, similar to velocities in Galilean relativity. A measurement of a rapidity difference $\Delta y$ between particles (or $\Delta\eta$ if the particles involved are massless) is hence not dependent on the longitudinal boost of the reference frame (such as the laboratory frame). This is an important feature for hadron collider physics, where the colliding partons carry different longitudinal momentum fractions x, which means that the rest frames of the parton-parton collisions will have different longitudinal boosts.

== Relation to rapidity ==
In the limit where the particle is travelling close to the speed of light, or equivalently in the approximation that the mass of the particle is negligible, one can make the substitution $m \ll |\mathbf{p}| \Rightarrow E \approx |\mathbf{p}| \Rightarrow \eta \approx y$ (i.e. in this limit, the particle's only energy is its momentum-energy, similar to the case of the photon), and hence the pseudorapidity converges to the definition of rapidity used in experimental particle physics:

$$y \equiv \frac{1}{2} \ln \left(\frac{E+p_\text{L}}{E-p_\text{L}}\right)$$

This differs slightly from the definition of rapidity in special relativity, which uses $\left|\mathbf{p}\right|$ instead of $p_\text{L}$. However, pseudorapidity depends only on the polar angle of the particle's trajectory, and not on the energy of the particle. One speaks of the "forward" direction in a hadron collider experiment, which refers to regions of the detector that are close to the beam axis, at high $|\eta|$; in contexts where the distinction between "forward" and "backward" is relevant, the former refers to the positive z-direction and the latter to the negative z-direction.

The rapidity as a function of pseudorapidity is given by

$$y = \ln\left( \frac{\sqrt{m^2 + p_\text{T}^2 \cosh^2 \eta} + p_\text{T} \sinh \eta}{\sqrt{m^2 + p_\text{T}^2}}\right),$$

where $p_\text{T}\equiv\sqrt{p_\text{x}^{2}+p_\text{y}^{2}}$ is the transverse momentum (i.e. the component of the three-momentum perpendicular to the beam axis).

Using a second-order Maclaurin expansion of $y$ expressed in $m/p_\text{T}$ one can approximate rapidity by

$$y \approx \eta - \frac{p_\text{L}}{2 |\mathbf{p}|} \left( \frac{m}{p_\text{T}}\right)^2 = \eta - \frac{\tanh{\eta}}{2} \left( \frac{m}{p_\text{T}}\right)^2 = \eta - \frac{\cos{\theta}}{2} \left( \frac{m}{p_\text{T}}\right)^2,$$

which makes it easy to see that for relativistic particles with $p_\text{T} \gg m$, pseudorapidity becomes equal to (true) rapidity.

Rapidity is used to define a measure of angular separation between particles commonly used in particle physics $\Delta R \equiv \sqrt{\left(\Delta y\right)^{2} + \left(\Delta \phi\right)^{2}}$, which is Lorentz invariant under a boost along the longitudinal (beam) direction. Often, the rapidity term in this expression is replaced by pseudorapidity, yielding a definition with purely angular quantities: $\Delta R \equiv \sqrt{\left(\Delta \eta\right)^{2} + \left(\Delta \phi\right)^{2}}$, which is Lorentz invariant if the involved particles are massless. The difference in azimuthal angle, $\Delta\phi$, is invariant under Lorentz boosts along the beam line (z-axis) because it is measured in a plane (i.e. the "transverse" x-y plane) orthogonal to the beam line.

== Values ==
A plot of polar angle vs. pseudorapidity.

Here are some representative values:

$\theta$	$\eta$	$\theta$	$\eta$
0°	∞	180°	−∞
0.1°	7.04	179.9°	−7.04
0.5°	5.43	179.5°	−5.43
1°	4.74	179°	−4.74
2°	4.05	178°	−4.05
5°	3.13	175°	−3.13
10°	2.44	170°	−2.44
20°	1.74	160°	−1.74
30°	1.32	150°	−1.32
45°	0.88	135°	−0.88
60°	0.55	120°	−0.55
80°	0.175	100°	−0.175
90°	0		

Pseudorapidity is odd about $\theta = 90^\circ$. In other words, $\eta(\theta) = -\eta(180^\circ - \theta)$.

== Conversion to Cartesian momenta ==
Hadron colliders measure physical momenta in terms of transverse momentum $p_\text{T}$, polar angle in the transverse plane $\phi$ and pseudorapidity $\eta$. To obtain Cartesian momenta $\langle p_\text{x}, p_\text{y}, p_\text{z} \rangle$ (with the $z$-axis defined as the beam axis), the following conversions are used:

$$p_\text{x} = p_\text{T} \cos \phi$$
$$p_\text{y} = p_\text{T} \sin \phi$$
$$p_\text{z} = p_\text{T} \sinh{\eta},$$

which gives $|\mathbf{p}|= p_\text{T} \cosh{\eta}$. Note that $p_\text{z}$ is the longitudinal momentum component, which is denoted $p_\text{L}$ in the text above ($p_\text{z}$ is the standard notation at hadron colliders).

The equivalent relations to get the full four-momentum (in natural units) using "true" rapidity $y$ are:

$$p_\text{x} = p_\text{T} \cos \phi$$
$$p_\text{y} = p_\text{T} \sin \phi$$
$$p_\text{z} = m_\text{T} \sinh{y}$$
$$E = m_\text{T} \cosh{y},$$

where $m_\text{T} \equiv \sqrt{p_\text{T}^2+m^2}$ is the transverse mass.

A boost of velocity $\beta_\text{z}$ along the beam-axis of velocity corresponds to an additive change in rapidity of $y_\text{boost}$ using the relation $\beta_\text{z}=\tanh{y_\text{boost}}$. Under such a Lorentz transformation, the rapidity of a particle will become $y' = y + y_\text{boost}$ and the four-momentum becomes

$$p'_\text{x} = p_\text{T} \cos \phi$$
$$p'_\text{y} = p_\text{T} \sin \phi$$
$$p'_\text{z} = m_\text{T} \sinh{\left(y+y_\mathrm{boost}\right)}$$
$$E' = m_\text{T} \cosh{\left(y+y_\mathrm{boost}\right)}.$$

This sort of transformation is common in hadron colliders. For example, if two hadrons of identical type undergo an inelastic collision along the beam axis with the same speed, then the corresponding rapidity will be

$$y_\mathrm{boost}=\frac{1}{2}\ln\frac{x_1}{x_2},$$

where $x_1$ and $x_2$ are the momentum fraction of the colliding partons. When several particles are produced in the same collision, the difference in rapidity $\Delta y_{ij}=y_i-y_j$ between any two particles $i$ and $j$ will be invariant under any such boost along the beam axis, and if both particles are massless ($m_i=m_j=0$), this will also hold for pseudorapidity ($\Delta \eta_{ij}$).

== Bibliography ==
- V. Chiochia (2010) Accelerators and Particle Detectors from University of Zurich
