= Cecilia Lindgren =

Complex trait geneticist

Cecilia Margareta Lindgren is a Swedish geneticist. She is a Professor of Genomic Endocrinology & Metabolism in the Nuffield Department of Population Health at the University of Oxford, where she is also Group Head at the Wellcome Centre for Human Genetics and a research fellow at St. Anne's College. She became Director of the Big Data Institute at Oxford on 1 April 2021; she had previously been a Senior Group Leader at the Institute. Lindgren is best known for her research on the genetics of obesity and other complex traits.

== Education and career ==
Lindgren earned a master’s degree in molecular genetics from Lund University in 1999. She completed her Ph.D. at Lund in 2002, half of which was undertaken at the Genome Centre of Whitehead Institute under supervision of Dr. David Altshuler, Dr. Eric Lander and Dr. Leif Groop.

== Research ==
After receiving her Ph.D., she conducted postdoctoral research at the Karolinska Institute (2002-2006) before joining the faculty of Oxford at the Wellcome Centre for Human Genetics (WHG) on a Throne-Holst Fellowship in (2006). Next, she was awarded a Scientific Leadership Fellow (2007), and a Wellcome Career Development Fellowship (2009) for her work on mapping out the genetic architecture of common forms of obesity, with a particular focus on fat distribution. After this she joined the Broad Institute of Harvard and MIT as a scholar in residence (2012). She left the Broad in 2015 to join the faculty at the Big Data Institute, where she was appointed director in early 2021.She is a research fellow at St. Anne’s college (2011-) and a Wellcome Trust Investigator (2020-).

She is a world leader in the field of cardiometabolic traits, studying genetic predisposition and underlying molecular mechanisms of human diseases. Early ground-breaking contributions include the discovery of PPARG as a diabetes risk locus (Nature Genetics 2000), which later propelled the field of human complex disease genetics (Nature 2007), and the discovery of concerted down-regulation of the mitochondrial oxidative phosphorylation pathway in human diabetic muscle as a cause of impaired glycaemic status (Nature Genetics 2003). Since becoming an independent investigator in 2009 she has led seminal studies in the genetics of obesity and related phenotypes, which has delivered thousands of genetic loci predisposing to common obesity (Nature Genetics 2008, Nature Genetics 2019, HMG 2019). Importantly, she has demonstrated that sexual dimorphism of fat distribution relates causally to cardiometabolic and reproductive disease (Nature Genetics 2011, Nature 2015, HMG 2018, PLoS Genetics 2019, Nature Genetics 2019). This new paradigm has opened a whole new field of research dissecting the biology underpinning common diseases in women and men. She has co-authored over 600 papers, amassing over 123,000 citations and a H-index of 126 (Google Scholar), 111 (Scopus).

In line with this, she is co-chairing a range of large-scale international common disease consortia and she is a co-founder of the International Common Disease Alliance (ICDA), which she also has co-led since its genesis, first with Dr. Eric Lander (2017-2019), next Dr. Mark Daly (2019-2020), and then as part of a new Executive Committee to drive the Alliance forward (2020-).

Beyond her scientific work, Dr. Lindgren has been active in advocacy and mentoring. She has supported the career development of faculty members and post-doctoral researchers in the UK and internationally. In 2018, she received the Mentorship Award from the American Society of Human Genetics.

== Awards and honors ==
In 2013, Lindgren was the inaugural winner of the Leena Peltonen Prize for Excellence in Human Genetics, and the 30th Khwarizmi International Award in 2017. In 2018, the American Society of Human Genetics awarded Lindgren its Mentorship Award. In 2023, Lindgren was also awarded the Mary Lyon Medal by The Genetics Society and was inducted into the Academy of Medical Sciences, as a Fellow.
