= Anne Ridley =

British biologist (born 1963)

Anne Ridley FRS FRSB FMedSci FRMS
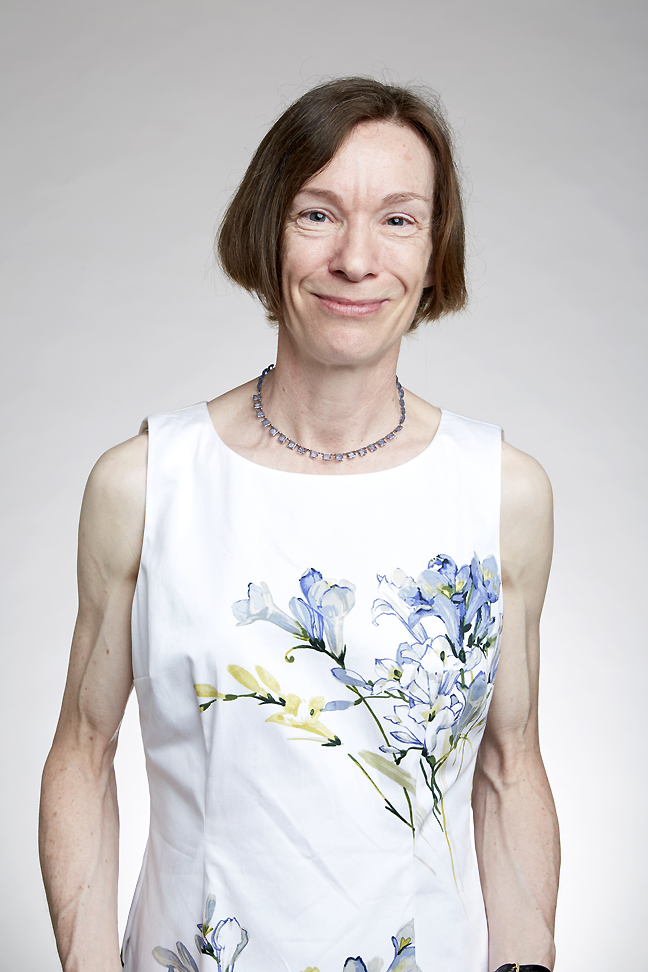
- Ridley in 2017
- Born: Anne Jacqueline Ridley; 1963 (age 62–63)
- Education: University of Cambridge; University of London
- Awards: EMBO Member (2002); Liliane Bettencourt Prize (2004)
- Scientific career
- Fields: Cancer; Metastasis; Cell biology; Cell migration; Cell signalling; Rho GTPases
- Workplaces: University of Bristol; King's College London; University College London; Institute of Cancer Research; Massachusetts Institute of Technology; Whitehead Institute
- Thesis: Mechanisms of oncogene action and interaction in Schwann cells (1989)
- Doctoral advisor: Hartmut Land
- Website: research-information.bristol.ac.uk/en/persons/anne-j-ridley(68d1bf7e-4a1b-4bcb-abd8-316e35f5f768).html

Anne Jacqueline Ridley (born 1963) is a British biologist who is professor of Cell Biology and Head of School for Cellular and Molecular Medicine at the University of Bristol. She was previously a professor at King's College London.

== Education ==
Ridley was educated at Clare College, Cambridge and awarded a Bachelor of Arts degree in Natural Sciences (Biochemistry) from the University of Cambridge in 1985. After being encouraged by Tim Hunt to pursue a career in research she moved to the University of London where she was awarded a Doctor of Philosophy degree in 1989 for research investigating the regulation of oncogenes in Schwann cells supervised by Hartmut Land at the Imperial Cancer Research Fund.

== Career and research ==
Ridley started her career as a postdoctoral researcher at the Whitehead Institute in Cambridge, Massachusetts from 1989 to 1990 and the Institute of Cancer Research in London from 1990 to 1993. She was appointed research group leader at the Ludwig Institute for Cancer Research at University College London (UCL) from 1993 to 2007 and Professor of Cell Biology at UCL from 2003 to 2007.

Since 2007, she has been Professor at King's College London and her research has made contributions to our understanding of cancer, tumour progression and inflammation through her work on cell migration and the Rho family of GTPases.

Work in her laboratory has influenced many areas of medical science, from metastasis to cardiovascular disease and infection. Funding for her research has been provided by the Biotechnology and Biological Sciences Research Council (BBSRC), the Medical Research Council (MRC), Cancer Research UK (CRUK) and Worldwide Cancer Research.

=== Awards and honours ===
Ridley was elected a Fellow of the Royal Society (FRS) in 2017. She was also awarded the Robert Hooke Medal by the British Society of Cell Biology (BSCB) in 2000, EMBO Membership in 2002 and the Liliane Bettencourt Prize for Life Sciences in 2004. She was elected a Fellow of the Royal Society of Biology (FRSB) in 2009 and a Fellow of the Academy of Medical Sciences (FMedSci) in 2012. She became an honorary fellow of the Royal Microscopical Society (FRMS) in 2014.
