= Peter Visscher =

Dutch-born Australian geneticist

Peter Visscher FRS FAA
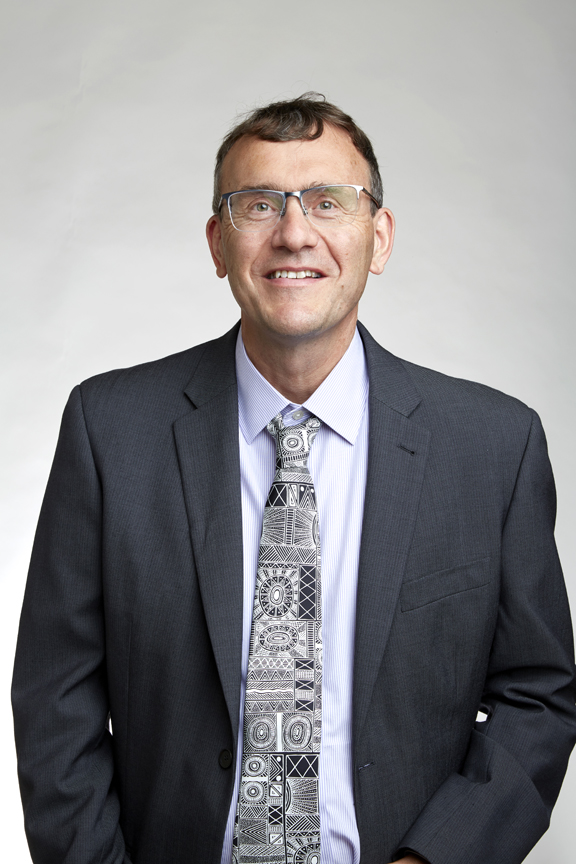
- Visscher in 2018
- Born: Peter Martin Visscher; Netherlands
- Education: University of Edinburgh
- Known for: Quantitative genetics
- Scientific career
- Fields: Genetics
- Workplaces: Queensland Institute of Medical Research; University of Queensland; University of Oxford
- Thesis: Estimation of genetic parameters in dairy cattle using an animal model and implications for genetic improvement (1991)
- Doctoral advisor: Bill Hill
- Website: researchers.uq.edu.au/researcher/1487

Peter Martin Visscher is a Dutch-born Australian geneticist who is professor and chair of Quantitative Genetics at the University of Queensland. He is also a professorial research fellow at the University of Queensland's Institute for Molecular Bioscience and an affiliate professor at their Queensland Brain Institute.

== Education ==
Visscher was educated at the University of Edinburgh, where he was awarded a PhD in 1991 for research supervised by Bill Hill.

== Career and research ==
Visscher is known for his research aimed at investigating the genetic bases of complex human traits. His research also focuses on studies in trait variation in populations. Visscher applied statistical analysis methods to quantify and dissect the contribution of DNA polymorphisms to variation.

=== Honors and awards ===
Visscher is a senior principal research fellow of the National Health and Medical Research Council. He was elected a Fellow of the Australian Academy of Science in 2010. He was elected a foreign member of the Royal Netherlands Academy of Arts and Sciences and fellow of and the Royal Society in 2018. Also in 2018, he received a Laureate Fellowship from the Australian Research Council.
