= Josephine Pemberton =

British evolutionary biologist

Josephine Pemberton FRS
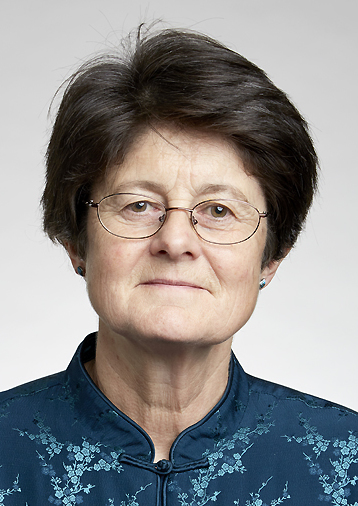
- Pemberton in 2017
- Education: University of Oxford (BA); University of Reading (PhD)
- Awards: Molecular Ecology Prize (2011); EMBO Member (2014); Fellow of the Royal Society (2017); Darwin-Wallace Medal (2018)
- Scientific career
- Fields: Evolutionary biology; Molecular ecology
- Workplaces: University of Edinburgh; University of Cambridge
- Thesis: An investigation into the population genetics of British fallow deer (Dama dama L.) (1983)
- Doctoral advisor: Robert H. Smith
- Other academic advisors: Sam Berry
- Website: pemberton.bio.ed.ac.uk

Josephine M. Pemberton FRS is a British evolutionary biologist. She is Chair of Natural History at the University of Edinburgh, where she conducts research in parentage analysis, pedigree reconstruction, inbreeding depression, parasite resistance, and quantitative trait locus (QTL) detection in natural populations. She has worked primarily on long-term studies of soay sheep on St Kilda, and red deer on the island of Rùm.

== Education ==
Pemberton was educated at the University of Oxford (where she read Zoology) and the University of Reading where she was awarded a PhD in 1983 for research on the population genetics of fallow deer supervised by Robert H. Smith.

== Research and career ==
After her PhD, she was a postdoctoral researcher at University College London and the University of Cambridge. This was followed by appointments as a BBSRC Advanced Fellow in Cambridge and Edinburgh, before being appointed a Lecturer in 1994 at the University of Edinburgh, where she has worked ever since. Her research has been funded by the Biotechnology and Biological Sciences Research Council (BBSRC) and Natural Environment Research Council (NERC).

=== Awards and honours ===
Pemberton was awarded the Molecular Ecology Prize in 2011 and EMBO Membership in 2014. She was elected a Fellow of the Royal Society (FRS) in 2017. She was awarded the Darwin-Wallace Medal in 2018 and was named Chair of Natural History in 2020. In 2024, she was awarded the Zoological Society of London Frink Medal and was awarded honorary membership by the British Ecological Society, the Society's highest honour. In 2025, she was awarded the Genetics Society Medal for outstanding contributions to genetics.
