= Event shape observables =

In high energy physics, event shapes observables are quantities used to characterize the geometry of the outcome of a collision between high energy particles in a collider. Specifically, event shapes observables quantify the general pattern traced by the trajectories of the particles resulting from the collision.

The most common event shape observables include:

- The sphericity;
- The aplanarity;
- The thrust.
- The C-parameter;
- The jet broadening.
