= Nicholas Hastie =

British geneticist

Professor Nicholas Hastie CBE FRS FRSE
- Born: Nicholas Dixon Hastie; 29 March 1947 (age 79)
- Education: University of Liverpool; University of Cambridge
- Awards: CBE
- Scientific career
- Workplaces: MRC Human Genetics Unit; University of Edinburgh
- Thesis: The role of the nucleus in influenza virus replication (1973)
- Website: www.ed.ac.uk/profile/professor-nick-hastie

Nicholas Dixon Hastie (born 1947) is a British geneticist, and former Director of the MRC Human Genetics Unit at the University of Edinburgh.

== Education ==
He attended Colwyn Bay Grammar school (it became Ysgol Eirias in 1967), where he sang in the choral society.

Hastie was educated at the University of Liverpool and the University of Cambridge.

== Awards and honours ==
In 1990, Hastie was elected to the European Molecular Biology Organisation. In 2001 he was awarded the Clinical Genetics Society Medal. Hastie was elected a Fellow of the Royal Society in 2002. His nomination reads

Distinguished for his original and varied contributions to mammalian developmental genetics, genome organisation and gene expression. His early work established the abundance of messenger RNAs during mouse development, and led to the cloning of several genes that are expressed specifically in the liver. Further studies of the serpin gene family uncovered the first clear example of "accelerated protein evolution". At this time he also identified several novel repetitive elements in the mouse genome. His group was the first to characterise mammalian telomeres, and to demonstrate telomere shortening with age in man. Nick Hastie's current work is focused on human developmental mutations, notably Wilm's tumour and Aniridia. His group demonstrated that aniridia, and the mouse equivalent, smalleye, are caused by mutations in the PAX6 gene. He continues to make incisive contributions to our understanding of the role of WT1, the candidate Wilm's Tumour gene, in development of the kidney and gonad.

In 2006, Hastie was awarded a CBE for services to science. In 2008, Hastie was awarded the Genetics Society Medal. Hastie was also a member of the Faculty of 1000.
