= Peter Keightley =

British geneticist

Professor Peter Keightley FRS
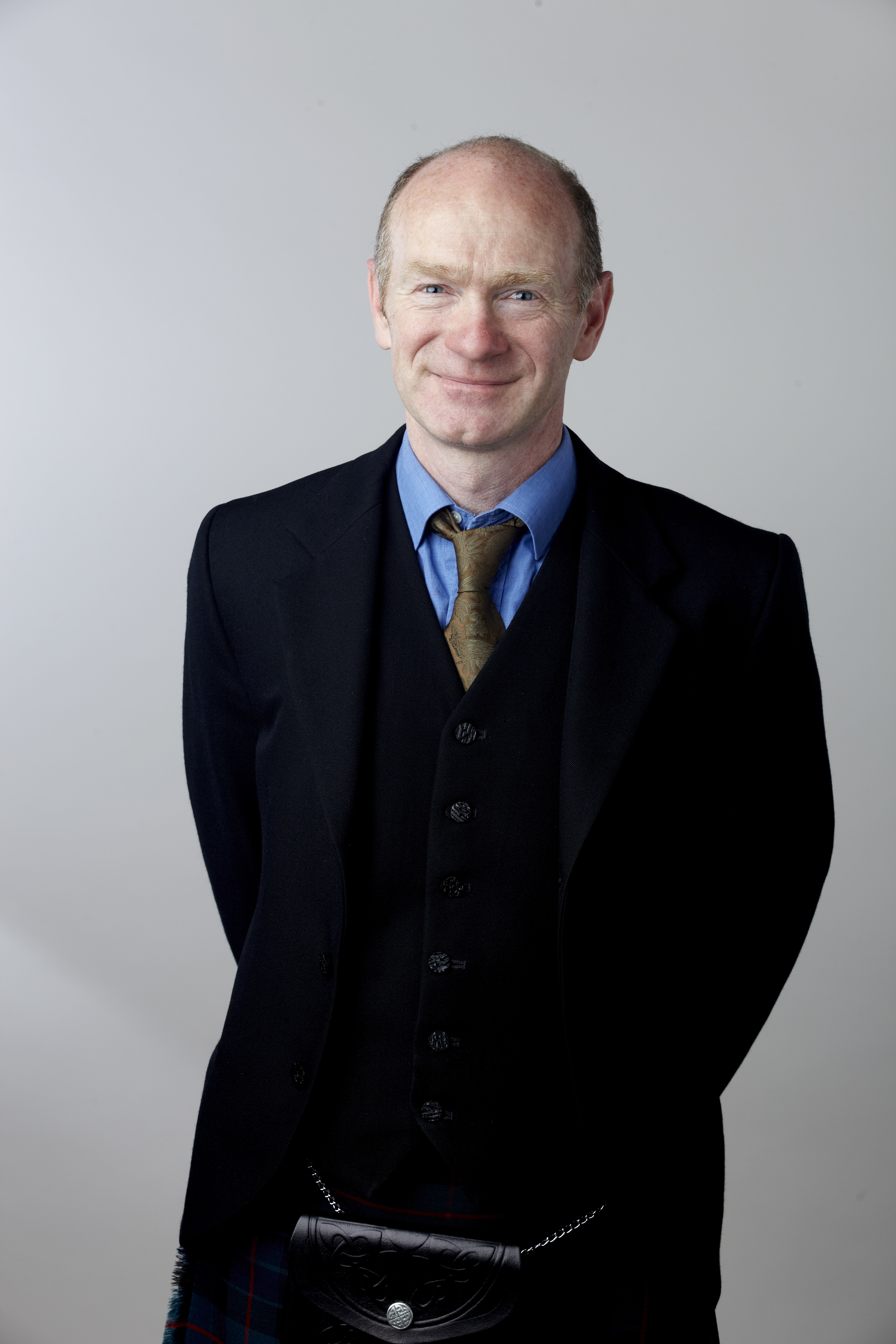
- Keightley in 2014
- Born: Peter D. Keightley
- Education: University of Edinburgh
- Awards: FRS (2014)
- Scientific career
- Fields: Evolutionary genetics; Genomics; Murid rodents; Drosophila; Chlamydomonas
- Workplaces: University of Edinburgh
- Thesis: Studies of quantitative genetic variation (1989)
- Doctoral advisor: William G. Hill, also influenced by Henrik Kacser
- Website: www.homepages.ed.ac.uk/pkeightl

Peter D. Keightley is a British geneticist who is Professor of Evolutionary Genetics at the Institute of Evolutionary Biology in School of Biological Sciences at the University of Edinburgh.

== Education ==
Keightley was educated at the University of Edinburgh where he was awarded a PhD in 1989 for research on genetic variation supervised by William G. Hill. During his doctoral work he collaborated with Henrik Kacser on a highly cited paper on genetic dominance.

== Research ==
Keightley leads a laboratory which works on evolutionary genetics and the evolutionary impact of new mutations on molecular genetic and quantitative trait variation and fitness. His research investigates genetic variation and adaptation through the analysis of nucleotide variation within natural populations and between different species.

Keightley's research has been funded by the Biotechnology and Biological Sciences Research Council (BBSRC).

=== Awards and honours ===
Keightley was elected a Fellow of the Royal Society in 2014. His nomination reads:

Peter Keightley is a leading evolutionary geneticist. He has made seminal contributions to the genetics and evolution of quantitative traits, and to molecular evolution and variation. His work combines theoretical modelling, genetic experimentation and bioinformatic studies of DNA sequences, in an unusually productive and innovative way. His work has shed light on several fundamental questions in genetics and evolution. He is especially well known for his work on the effects on fitness and rate of occurrence of spontaneous mutations. This has led to a much improved estimate of the deleterious mutation rate for the genome as a whole.
