= Hadron collider =

Type of particle accelerator

A hadron collider is a very large particle accelerator built to test the predictions of various theories in particle physics, high-energy physics or nuclear physics by colliding hadrons. A hadron collider uses tunnels to accelerate, store, and collide two particle beams.

== Colliders ==
Only a few hadron colliders have been built. These are:

- Intersecting Storage Rings (ISR), European Organization for Nuclear Research (CERN), in operation 1971–1984.
- Super Proton Synchrotron (SPS), CERN, used as a hadron collider 1981–1991.
- Tevatron, Fermi National Accelerator Laboratory (Fermilab), in operation 1983–2011.
- Relativistic Heavy Ion Collider (RHIC), Brookhaven National Laboratory, in operation since 2000.
- Large Hadron Collider (LHC), CERN, in operation since 2008.

== See also ==
- Synchrotron
