= Cone algorithm =

Computer algorithm

In computational geometry, the cone algorithm is an algorithm for identifying the particles that are near the surface of an object composed of discrete particles. Its applications include computational surface science and computational nanoscience. The cone algorithm was first described in a publication about nanogold in 2005.

The cone algorithm works well with clusters in condensed phases, including solid and liquid phases. It can handle the situations when one configuration includes multiple clusters or when holes exist inside clusters. It can also be applied to a cluster iteratively to identify multiple sub-surface layers.
