= Jet (particle physics) =

Narrow cone of hadrons and other particles

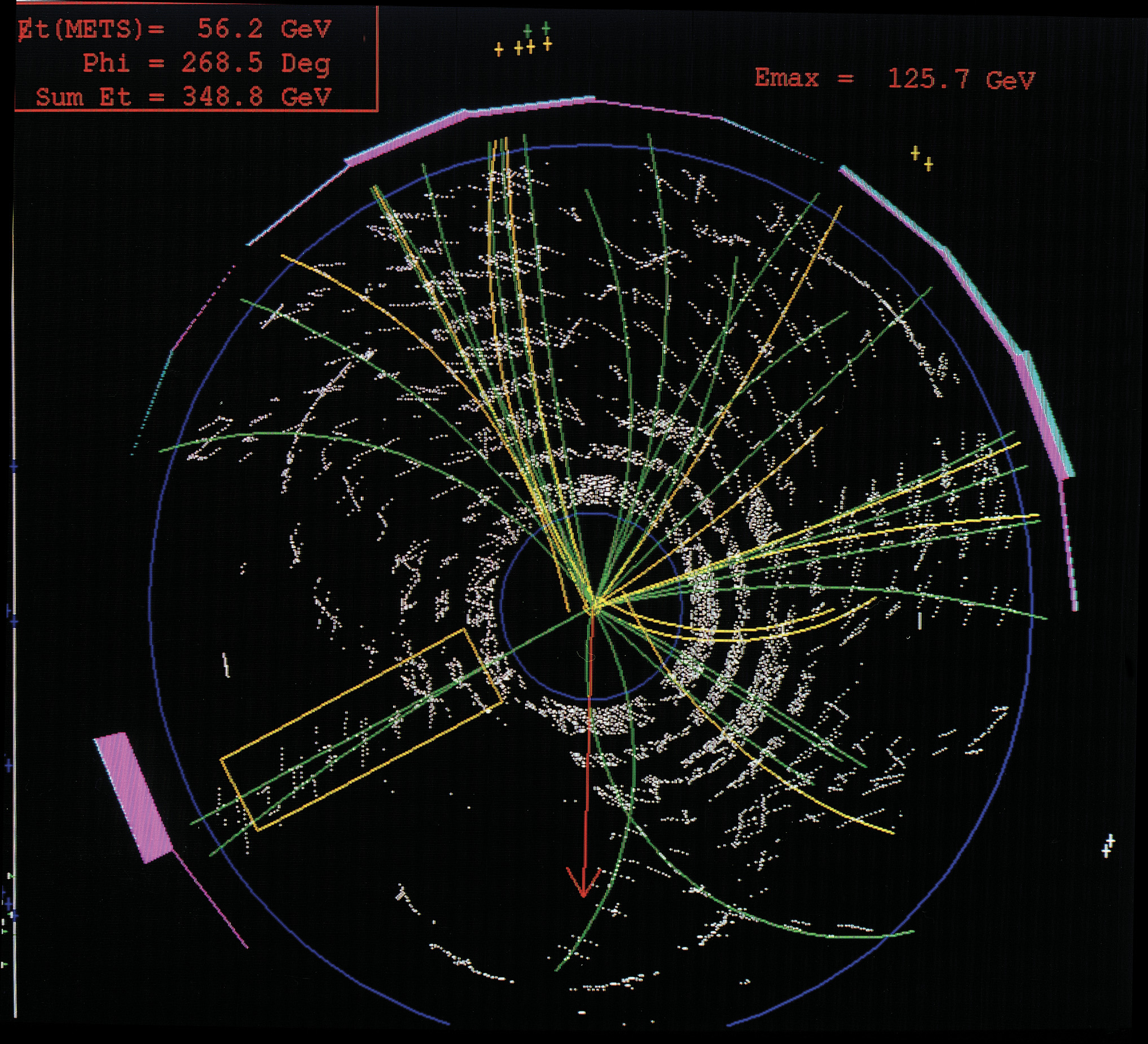
Top quark and anti top quark pair decaying into jets, visible as collimated collections of particle tracks, and other fermions in the CDF detector at Tevatron.

A jet is a narrow cone of hadrons and other particles produced by the hadronization of quarks and gluons in a particle physics or heavy ion experiment. Particles carrying a color charge, i.e. quarks and gluons, cannot exist in free form because of quantum chromodynamics (QCD) confinement which only allows for colorless states. When protons collide at high energies, their color charged components each carry away some of the color charge. In accordance with confinement, these fragments create other colored objects around them to form colorless hadrons. The ensemble of these objects is called a jet, since the fragments all tend to travel in the same direction, forming a narrow "jet" of particles. Jets are measured in particle detectors and studied in order to determine the properties of the original quarks.

A jet definition includes a jet algorithm and a recombination scheme. The former defines how some inputs, e.g. particles or detector objects, are grouped into jets, while the latter specifies how a momentum is assigned to a jet. For example, jets can be characterized by the thrust. The jet direction (jet axis) can be defined as the thrust axis. In particle physics experiments, jets are usually built from clusters of energy depositions in the detector calorimeter. When studying simulated processes, the calorimeter jets can be reconstructed based on a simulated detector response. However, in simulated samples, jets can also be reconstructed directly from stable particles emerging from fragmentation processes. Particle-level jets are often referred to as truth-jets. A good jet algorithm usually allows for obtaining similar sets of jets at different levels in the event evolution.

Jet algorithms fall into two broad families. Cone algorithms define a jet as the particles lying within a circle of fixed radius R in the rapidity–azimuth plane around a stable jet axis. An early attempt to standardize them, and to list the properties any jet definition should satisfy, was the Snowmass Accord of 1990. Sequential-recombination algorithms instead merge particles pairwise according to a distance measure. The k_{T} algorithm merges soft and collinear pairs first, the Cambridge–Aachen algorithm uses angular separation alone, and the anti-k_{T} algorithm clusters around the hardest particles first, producing regular, cone-like jets. Many cone algorithms used in practice started their search from seed particles and were later found not to be infrared safe; the seedless SISCone algorithm was the first cone algorithm shown to be infrared and collinear safe. The anti-k_{T} algorithm became the default jet algorithm of the ATLAS and CMS experiments at the Large Hadron Collider. A typical recombination scheme is the E-scheme, or 4-vector scheme, in which the 4-vector of a jet is defined as the sum of 4-vectors of all its constituents.

In relativistic heavy ion physics, jets are important because the originating hard scattering is a natural probe for the QCD matter created in the collision, and indicate its phase. When the QCD matter undergoes a phase crossover into quark gluon plasma, the energy loss in the medium grows significantly, effectively quenching (reducing the intensity of) the outgoing jet.

Example of jet analysis techniques are:

- jet correlation
- flavor tagging (e.g., b-tagging)
- jet substructure.

The Lund string model is an example of a jet fragmentation model.

== Jet production ==
Jets are produced in QCD hard scattering processes, creating high transverse momentum quarks or gluons, or collectively called partons in the partonic picture.

The probability of creating a certain set of jets is described by the jet production cross section, which is an average of elementary perturbative QCD quark, antiquark, and gluon processes, weighted by the parton distribution functions. For the most frequent jet pair production process, the two particle scattering, the jet production cross section in a hadronic collision is given by

$$\sigma_{ij \rightarrow k} = \sum_{i, j} \int d x_1 d x_2 d\hat{t} f_i^1(x_1, Q^2) f_j^2(x_2, Q^2) \frac{d\hat{\sigma}_{ij \rightarrow k}}{d\hat{t}},$$

with

- x, Q^{2}: longitudinal momentum fraction and momentum transfer
- $\hat{\sigma}_{ij \rightarrow k}$: perturbative QCD cross section for the reaction ij → k
- $f_i^a(x, Q^2)$: parton distribution function for finding particle species i in beam a.

Elementary cross sections $\hat{\sigma}$ are e.g. calculated to the leading order of perturbation theory in Peskin & Schroeder (1995), section 17.4. A review of various parameterizations of parton distribution functions and the calculation in the context of Monte Carlo event generators is discussed in T. Sjöstrand et al. (2003), section 7.4.1.

== Jet fragmentation ==
Perturbative QCD calculations may have colored partons in the final state, but only the colorless hadrons that are ultimately produced are observed experimentally. Thus, to describe what is observed in a detector as a result of a given process, all outgoing colored partons must first undergo parton showering and then combination of the produced partons into hadrons. The terms fragmentation and hadronization are often used interchangeably in the literature to describe soft QCD radiation, formation of hadrons, or both processes together.

As the parton which was produced in a hard scatter exits the interaction, the strong coupling constant will increase with its separation. This increases the probability for QCD radiation, which is predominantly shallow-angled with respect to the progenitor parton. Thus, one parton will radiate gluons, which will in turn radiate qq̅ pairs and so on, with each new parton nearly collinear with its parent. This can be described by convolving the spinors with fragmentation functions $P_{ji}\!\left(\frac{x}{z}, Q^2\right)$, in a similar manner to the evolution of parton density functions. This is described by a Dokshitzer-Gribov-Lipatov-Altarelli-Parisi (DGLAP) type equation

$$\frac{\partial}{\partial\ln Q^2} D_{i}^{h}(x, Q^2) = \sum_{j} \int_{x}^{1} \frac{dz}{z} \frac{\alpha_S}{4\pi} P_{ji}\!\left(\frac{x}{z}, Q^2\right) D_{j}^{h}(z, Q^2)$$

Parton showering produces partons of successively lower energy, and must therefore exit the region of validity for perturbative QCD. Phenomenological models must then be applied to describe the length of time when showering occurs, and then the combination of colored partons into bound states of colorless hadrons, which is inherently not-perturbative. One example is the Lund String Model, which is implemented in many modern event generators.

== Infrared and collinear safety ==
A jet algorithm is infrared safe if it yields the same set of jets after modifying an event to add a soft radiation. Similarly, a jet algorithm is collinear safe if the final set of jets is not changed after introducing a collinear splitting of one of the inputs. There are several reasons why a jet algorithm must fulfill these two requirements. Experimentally, jets are useful if they carry information about the seed parton. When produced, the seed parton is expected to undergo a parton shower, which may include a series of nearly-collinear splittings before the hadronization starts. Furthermore, the jet algorithm must be robust when it comes to fluctuations in the detector response. Theoretically, If a jet algorithm is not infrared and collinear safe, it can not be guaranteed that a finite cross-section can be obtained at any order of perturbation theory.

== See also ==
- Dijet event
