= Infrared safety =

Observables that are independent of low energy physics

In quantum field theory, and especially asymptotically free quantum field theories, an observable is infrared safe if it does not depend on the low energy/long distance physics of the theory. Such observables can therefore be calculated reliably using perturbative methods and then compared to experiment. An example of an observable which is infrared safe is the total scattering cross-section for the collision of an electron and a positron to produce hadrons.

== See also ==
- Asymptotic freedom
- Infrared divergence
- Kinoshita–Lee–Nauenberg theorem
