= Dijet event =

Collision between subatomic particles

In particle physics, a dijet event is a collision between subatomic particles that produces two particle jets.

Dijet events are measured at the LHC to constrain QCD models, in particular the parton evolution equations and parton distribution functions. This is accomplished by measuring the azimuthal correlations between the two jets.
