= Video games in Switzerland =

Video games in Switzerland have been released since the 1980s. In 2016, there were between 100 and 120 game companies, mostly small, corresponding to about 500 employees and a turnover of about 50 millions Swiss francs (which corresponds more or less to the same amount in US dollars or Euro).

The Swiss Game Award was created in 2013, with some of the winners being Feist (2016), Deru (2017) and FAR: Lone Sails (2019).

Today, Swiss games are released for all the current platforms: Nintendo Switch, Nintendo Switch 2, PlayStation 4, PlayStation 5, Xbox One, Xbox Series, Microsoft Windows, macOS, Android, iOS, including Apple Arcade.

== History ==
=== 1960s ===
At 17, René Sommer created the earliest known electronic game in Switzerland, a variant of the Nim game. Sommer would later work as an engineer at Logitech.

=== 1970s ===
At the end of the 1970s, students of Professor Jean-Daniel Nicoud at the Swiss Federal Institute of Technologies created video games. They developed games and graphical demonstrations for the Smaky 6. The games were adaptations of board games (e.g. chess, Nim, Oware) and arcade games of that time (e.g. Blockade, Breakout, Sprint 2, Lunar Lander).

In 1979, when asked by a journalist about the motivation behind creating games in a university laboratory, he answered, "The goal is indeed to learn how to program. The games provide both motivation to create challenging programs and present a number of truly difficult problems to solve."

=== 1980s ===
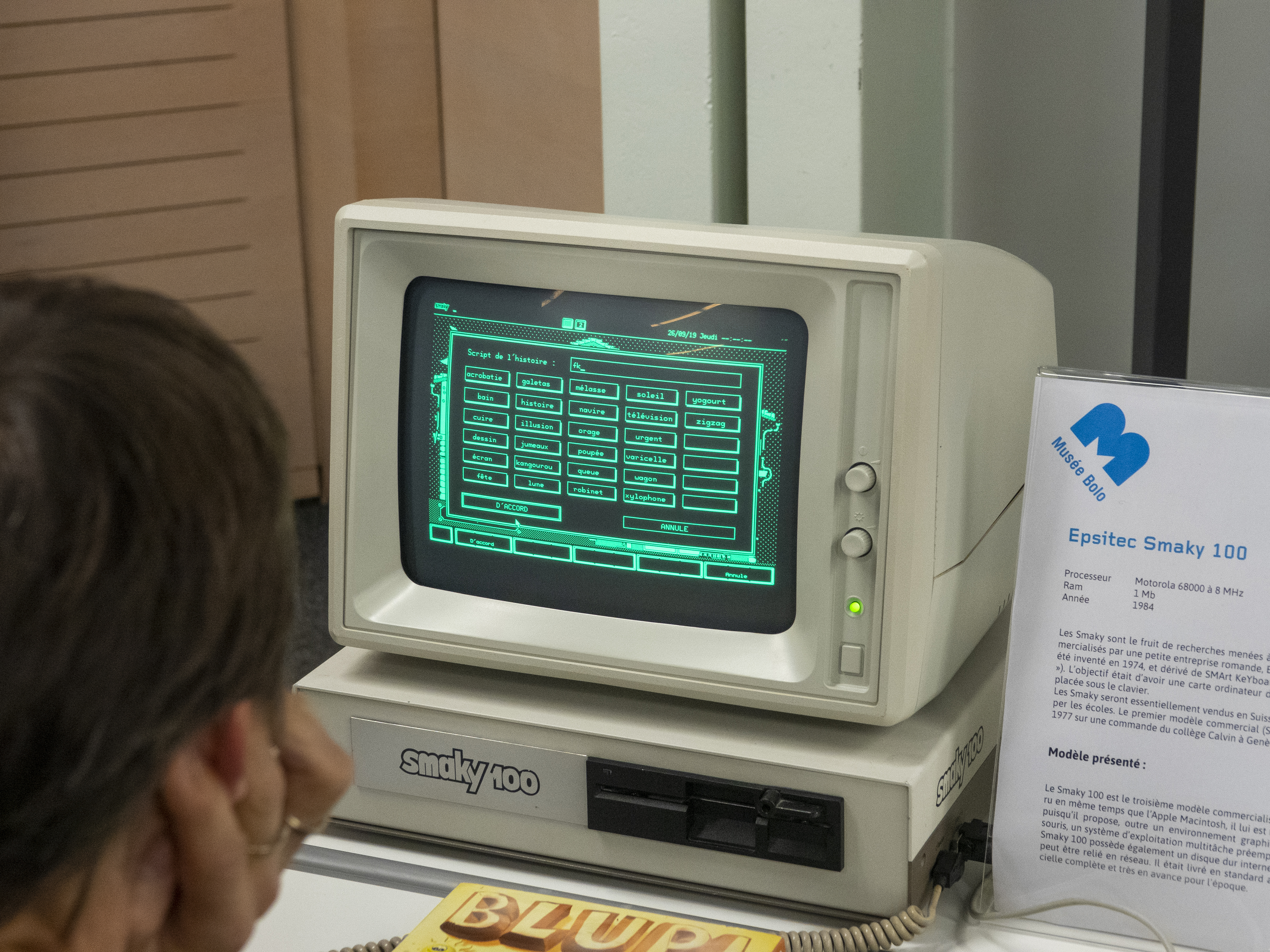
Blupi at Home on a Smaky.

During the 1980s, a few Swiss games were created for C64 (e.g. Robox), Atari ST (e.g. War Heli, Clown-o-Mania) and Amiga (e.g. Insanity Fight, Ball Raider, Dugger) computers. Alain Berset, who later became a member of the Swiss Federal Council in charge of culture, developed video games in his youth and saved them on cassettes around this time.

On the Swiss computers Smaky, games like Bong, Ping, or Mur were released. In 1988, Blupi, the Smaky's mascot, appeared in a game for the first time, in Blupi at Home.

=== 1990s ===
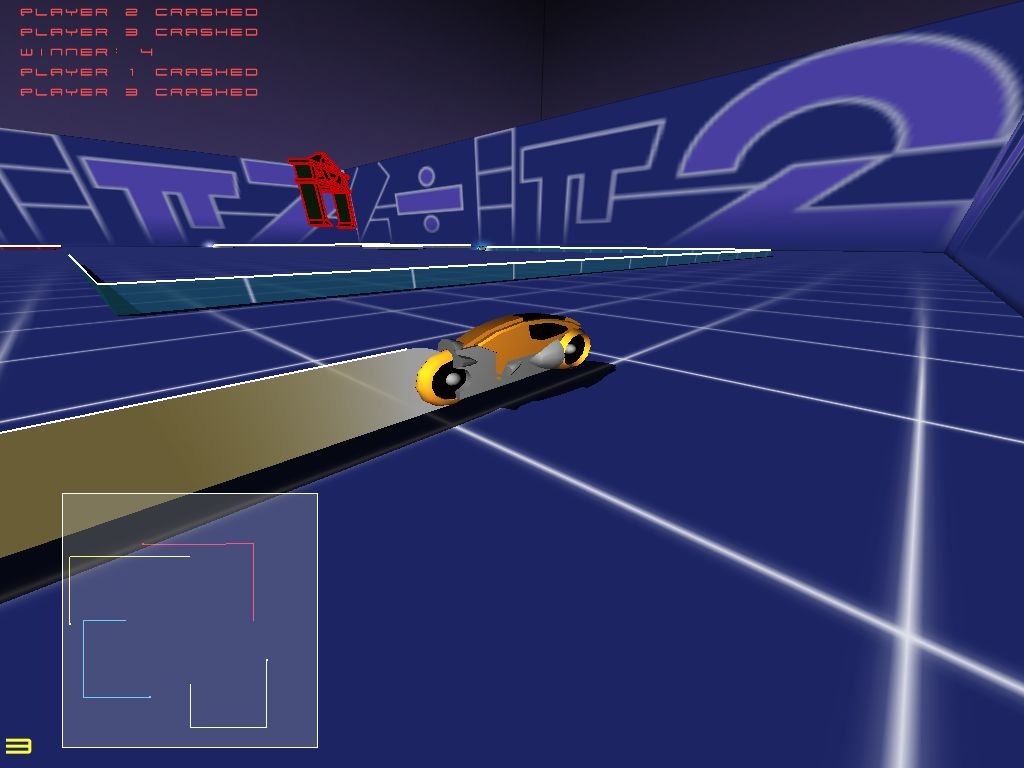
GLTron screenshot

Many Swiss games were released during the 1990s. As micro-computers became affordable in Switzerland and programming had been taught for years in schools, more and more games were created. Some are still known today because of their open source licences, e.g. The Last Eichhof (1993) or GLTron (1999), the latter being still regularly updated. Games appeared in various regions of Switzerland. At EPFL and then on external servers, a group of students created and maintained a multi-user dungeon game situated in the Middle Earth, MUME. GATE, a game similar to The Legend of Zelda was released on Apple IIGS and Classic Mac OS in 1991. The same year, Supaplex, similar to Boulder Dash, was released for Amiga and MS-DOS. Traps 'n' Treasures, a role-playing video game, was released in 1993 on Amiga.

Most of the games created by Daniel Roux for Epsitec, a Swiss company producing the Smaky computers, were released between 1988 and 2003. Eleven of them displayed the brand mascot, a yellow character named Blupi. Some of these games were educational (e.g. Blupi at Home, Fun with Blupi), others were real-time simulation games (e.g. Planet Blupi) or platform games (e.g. Speedy Eggbert). Games were created first for Smaky, and adapted for MS-DOS and Windows, and sometimes translated (in English, Korean, Hebrew, etc.). More than 100.000 copies of the Windows version of Speedy Eggbert were distributed in North America.

In 1997, a Tennis game was played remotely between EPFL and UNIGE with virtual reality devices and movement recognition, using telecommunications.

=== 2000s ===
In 2001, the Swiss Federal Office of Public Health released Catch the Sperm, a video game aimed at promoting prevention against HIV. The same year, Epsitec released an educational programming game offering to program a robot and solve tasks thanks to a lookalike C++ programming language.

In 2008, the Swiss game company Giants Software released Farming Simulator. The original game would be followed by yearly by a series of sequels.

Between 2008 and 2009, Pro Helvetia, the Swiss national foundation aimed at subsiding culture, mapped the existing Swiss game industry and evaluated that there was a potential for development. They launched in 2010 a program called Game Culture in order to help the development of video games in Switzerland. The program lasted 3 years, with a budget of 1.5 million CHF.

=== 2010s ===
The number of Swiss games released in the 2010s increased significantly thanks to mobile platforms (iOS and Android), digital distribution service Steam for computers, and more accessible game engines available to create games. At the same time, state subventions kept growing. Many Swiss games are released every year.

After Farming Simulator, another studio launched a series of simulator games. Released in 2014 by Urban Games, Train Fever allowed to be in charge of building train networks. It would be followed by Transport Fever in 2016 and Transport Fever 2 in 2019, which both included new types of vehicles.

In a report published in 2018, the Swiss Federal Council explained that

Video games are digital cultural objects, vectors of new forms of creativity and technological development. Their production represents a great potential, both for culture and for the economy and innovation sectors. In order to support the video game sector in all its dimensions, the Federal Council is proposing measures aimed at improving and sustaining the qualitative and quantitative development of the sector in Switzerland. In the future, it aims to strengthen the skills of creators and their integration into the industry, as well as to promote and publicise the specific features of cross-sectoral support.

— Swiss Federal Council, Le Conseil fédéral reconnaît le potentiel culturel des jeux vidéo, Communiqué de presse, 21 March 2018

In 2019, the Canton of Vaud launched funding to support game developers (50.000 CHF of financial help in total). It was the first Swiss Canton to do so.

=== 2020s ===
The Swiss Game Hub in Oerlikon, Zurich was created to allow small studios to collaborate and learn from each other. Among the games produced by its studios is The Wandering Village.

== Industry ==
=== Game designers ===
- Michael Frei (Plug & Play, Kids)
- Daniel Lutz (Monospace, Colorblind, Hitman Go, Lara Croft Go)
- Sid Meier
- Mario von Rickenbach (Plug & Play, Kids)
- Christian Schnellmann (Aux B, Kind of Soccer)
- Philomena Schwab (Niche, The Wandering Village)
- Ru Weerasuriya (God of War: Chains of Olympus, God of War: Ghost of Sparta, The Order: 1886)
- Don Schmocker (FAR: Lone Sails, FAR: Changing Tides, Herdling)

=== Companies ===
- Miniclip, a mobile game publisher and former browser game website
- Urban Games, makers of Train Fever and the Transport Fever franchise
- Giants Software, makers of Farming Simulator
- Okomotive, makers of FAR: Lone Sails, FAR: Changing Tides and Herdling
- Stray Fawn Studio, makers of Niche, Nimbatus, The Wandering Village, and Dungeon Clawler, publishers of Gambonanza, Airborne Empire, Flotsam, River Towns, Terrascape, and Retimed

=== Associations/organisations ===
- Pro Helvetia (State funding)
- The Swiss Game Developers Association (SGDA) (Developer representation)
- The Swiss chapter of the International Game Developers Association (Developer representation)
- SIEA (Game ratings and sales oversight)

=== Events ===
- Polylan (Lausanne)
- Fantasy Basel
- Numerik Games (Yverdon)
- Ludicious Festival (Zurich)
- Game Z Festival (Zurich)
- Polymanga (Montreux)
- NIFFF (Neuchâtel)
- Japan Impact (Lausanne)
- SwitzerLan (Bern)
- Zurich Game Show (Zurich)
- RetroMania (Payerne)

== Gamers Associations ==
- Swiss E-Sport Federation (SESF, Electronic Sports in Switzerland)
- Gaming Federation (Video game culture promotion)

== Schools/Academia ==
=== Education ===
- EPAC (MA)
- ETHZ (MA)
- HEAD, Geneva (MA)
- HSLU, Digital Ideation (BA, MA)
- SAE Institute (BA)
- Swiss Game Academy
- Zurich University of the Arts (ZHdK) (BA, MA)

=== Scientific research ===
==== Laboratories and departments ====
- bavelierlab at UNIGE. Led by Daphné Bavelier, the goal of the laboratory is the study of brain plasticity, especially when video games are played.
- EPFL Immersive Interaction Research Group.
- Game Technology Center at ETHZ.
- GameLab UNIL-EPFL. A study group based in the faculty of Humanities of UNIL and college of humanities of EPFL.
- MMI (Mensch-Maschine Interaktion, or Human–computer interaction) at University of Basel.
- Zurich University of the Arts Gamelab.
- TECFA, UNIGE.

==== Research projects ====
- Confoederatio Ludens: Swiss History of Games, Play and Game Design 1968-2000, a SNSF Sinergia project.
- Horror-Game-Politics, a SNSF Ambizione project led by Eugen Pfister.
- Pixelvetica, a project on the archiving of Swiss video games.

== Museums/exhibitions ==
Exhibitions dedicated to games have happened in Switzerland.

- Maison d'Ailleurs, Yverdon-les-Bains
  - Playtime – Videogame mythologies (11.03.2012 – 09.12.2012)
  - L’expo dont vous êtes le héros (18.11.2018 – 27.10.2019)
- Musée Bolo, Lausanne
  - Programmed disappearance (2012 – )
- MuDA (2015-2020), the Museum of Digital Arts, Zürich. They exhibited video games over the years.
- Stadt Museum, Aarau
  - PLAY (21.09.2018 – 07.07.2019)
- Swiss National Museum
  - Games – Geschichte der Videospiele (17.01.2020 – 06.09.2020)
  - Games (21.03.2021 – 10.10.2021)
- Museum of Design, Zürich
  - Game Design Today (17.02.2023 - 23.07.2023)
