= John Maynard Smith Prize =

Academic prize for evolutionary biology

The John Maynard Smith Prize is a prize given by the European Society for Evolutionary Biology on odd years to an outstanding young researcher. It was first awarded in 1997 and is named after the evolutionary biologist John Maynard Smith (1920–2004).

== List of winners ==
Source: European Society for Evolutionary Biology

Year	Awarded to	For
1997	Marie-Charlotte Anstett	Facilitation and constraints in the evolution of mutualism
1999	Nicolas Galtier	Non stationary models of nucleotide substitution and the evolution of base composition
2001	Alexander Badyaev	Paradox of rapid evolution of sexual size dimorphism: the role of ontogeny and maternal effects
2003	Patricia Beldade	The genetic basis of phenotypic variation: evolution and development of butterfly wing patterns
2005	Daven Presgraves	Speciation genes & selfish genes in Drosophila
2007	Andy Gardner	The evolution of spite
2009	Tanja Schwander	Evolution of genetic caste determination in social insects; Ben Sadd - Junior fellowship
2011	Rowan Barrett	The genetics of adaptation to changing environments; Emma Hine - Junior fellowship
2012	Tanja Stadler	Looking at the present to learn about the past; Daniel Matute - Junior fellowship
2013	Rich FitzJohn	What drives biological diversification? Detecting the traits under species selection; Line Ugelvig - Junior fellowship
2014	Laurie Stevison	The Time-Scale of Recombination Rate Evolution in Great Apes
2015	Matthew Hartfield	Mathematical adventures in sex and disease evolution
2016	E. Keith Bowers – University of Memphis, US	Silver spoons, sexy sons, and constraints on sex allocation
2017	Amanda Kyle Gibson – Emory University, Atlanta, US	What use is sex?
2018	Siobhan O’Brien – ETH Zurich, CH	Understanding the ecology and evolution of microbial social interactions in a complex world
2019	Karl Grieshop	Sexual conflict and the maintenance of genetic variance in fitness.
2020	Camilo Barbosa	
2021	Stefany Moreno-Gamez	
2022	Catalina Chaparro-Pedraza	
2023	Paul Jay	
2024	Magdalena Bohutínská	
2025	Hiroshi Arai	
2026	Wendy Valencia-Montoya	

== See also ==
- List of biology awards
