= Siv G. E. Andersson =

Swedish biologist (born 1959)

- Born: Siv Gun Elisabeth Andersson; 1959 (age 66–67)
- Education: Uppsala University (Ph.D.)
- Scientific career
- Fields: Evolutionary biology
- Institutions: Uppsala University, University of Cambridge
- Doctoral advisor: Charles Kurland
- Website: www.icm.uu.se/molecular-evolution/andersson-siv/

Siv Gun Elisabeth Andersson (born 1959) is a Swedish evolutionary biologist, professor of molecular evolution at Uppsala University. She is member of both the Royal Swedish Academy of Sciences and of Engineering. She is also Head of basic research at the Knut and Alice Wallenberg Foundation and has been co-director of the Swedish national center for large-scale research Science for Life Laboratory between 2017 and 2021. Her research focuses on the evolution of bacteria, mainly on intracellular parasites.

== Education and career ==
Andersson grew up in Horndal, Dalarna. Her mother was home care assistant and her father was employed in the wood industry. She studied Biology at Uppsala University, since the programme was the only one that had a course about DNA. She defended her PhD in molecular biology in 1990, under the supervision of Charles Kurland. She applied for a postdoctoral stipend from EMBO to continue her research in the United States, but ended up obtaining a research position at the MRC Laboratory of Molecular Biology in Cambridge. She became professor of molecular evolution in 2000, at the Uppsala University's Evolutionary Biology Center. She was elected at the Royal Swedish Academy of Sciences in 2005.

Andersson has been very active in developing the Swedish national center for large-scale research Science for Life Laboratory, especially its DNA sequencing and bioinformatics platforms. She served as Co-director for the center between 2017 and 2021.

During the 2020 COVID-19 pandemic, she contributed, together with Lars Engstrand and with the financial support of the Knut and Alice Wallenberg Foundation, to establish the first large-scale testing facility in Sweden

== Research ==
Andersson's research first focused around the role of codon usage in shaping bacterial genomes. After her postdoctoral fellowship, she contributed to sequence one of the first genome of an obligate intracellular parasite, Rickettsia prowazekii, the causative agent of epidemic typhus.

In her later career, her research continued to explore bacteria and their relationships with their different hosts. In particular, she is interested in the genomic consequences of long-term associations of intracellular bacteria. She explored the evolution of Bartonella, Wolbachia, and Planctomycetota, among others.

Andersson has published over 200 peer-reviewed articles, and has an h-index of 61, as of 2022.

== Notable awards and honors ==
- 2000 - Member of the Royal Swedish Academy of Engineering Sciences.
- 2002 - Letterstedtska prize for very significant investigation, among others for "an article in Nature (1998), which reports the whole genome sequence of the intracellular parasite Rickettsia prowazekii".
- 2004 - Member of EMBO.
- 2005 - Member of the Royal Swedish Academy of Sciences, number 1514, in the class Biological Sciences.
- 2005 - Göran Gustafsson Prize in molecular biology.
- 2005 - Grant for "excellent research" from the Swedish Research Council of SEK 44 millions (together with Hans Ellegren).
- 2009 - President of the European Society for Evolutionary Biology (2009-2011).
- 2011 - Wallenberg Scholar.
- 2017 - Extension of Knut and Alice Wallenberg Foundation of SEK 75 millions (together with Gunnar von Heijne).
