= Population Genetics Group =

Annual meeting of population geneticists in the UK

The Population Genetics Group (or PopGroup, or PGG) is an annual meeting of population geneticists held in the UK since 1968. The meetings have been very influential in promoting population and evolutionary genetics in the UK, Europe, and elsewhere. There have been long-standing connections between the PopGroup meeting and the journal Heredity. In 2017 Heredity published a special issue to mark the 50th meeting of the PopGroup.

The two and a half day meetings are held annually just before Christmas or in the new year at UK universities. Attendance is typically in the range of 190-250 participants. The meetings are characterised by a very informal atmosphere alongside scientific rigour.

PopGroup is a self-organising meeting, not part of any society or university, and with no formal membership. It is funded principally by participant conference fees, and is not for profit, though it has been additionally supported as a Sectional Interest Group by the Genetics Society.

The first meetings were held in January 1968 by a group of established population geneticists as an outgrowth of informal meetings on the evolutionary patterns of the snail Cepaea nemoralis.

PopGroup	Date	Location	Organisors	Programme?
61	Dec/Jan 2027/2028	Maybe Bangor?	Maybe Alex Papadopulos?	Not Yet
60	Jan 2027	Glasgow	Arne Jacobs, Kathryn Elmer, and Barbara Mable	Not Yet
59	Jan 2026	Lille	Camille Roux, Diala Abu-Awad, Vincent Castric, Thomas Lesaffre, and Roman Stetsenko	Not Yet
58	Jan 2025	Sheffield	Nicola Nadeau	Not Yet
57	Jan 2024	St. Andrews	Michael Ritchie	Not Yet
56	Jan 2023	London	Richard Nicholls	Not Yet
55	Jan 2022	Norwich^{α}	Mark McMullan	Yes
54	Jan 2021	Liverpool^{α}	Andrea Betancourt	Yes
53	Jan 2020	Leicester	Robert Hammond	Yes
52	Jan 2019	Oxford	Ravinder Kanda	Yes
51	Jan 2018	Bristol	Jon Bridle	Yes
50	Jan 2017	Cambridge	Chris Jiggins	Yes
49	Dec 2015	Edinburgh	Darren Obbard	Yes
48	Jan 2015	Sheffield	Roger Butlin	Yes
47	Jan 2014	Bath	Nick Priest	Yes
46	Dec 2012	Glasgow	Barb Mable	Yes
45	Jan 2012	Nottingham	Angus Davison et al.	Yes
44	Jan 2011	Hull	Dave Lunt & Lori LHandley	Yes
43	Jan 2010	Liverpool	Ilik Saccheri	Yes
42	Dec 2008	Cardiff	Mike Bruford	Yes
41	Dec 2007	Warwick	Dmitry Filatov	Yes
40	Jan 2007	Manchester	Cathy Walton	Yes
39	Dec 2005	Edinburgh	Deborah Charlesworth	Yes
38	Dec 2004	Reading	Richard Sibley & Mark Beaumont	Yes
37	Dec 2003	Sussex	Adam Eyre-Walker	Yes
36	Jan 2003	Leicester	Andre Gilburn	Yes
35	Jan 2002	Leeds	Roger Butlin	Yes
34	Dec 2000	Sheffield	Terry Burke	Yes
33	Jan 2000	Exeter	Mark MacNair	Yes
32	Jan 1999	Cambridge	Mike & Tamsin Majerus	Yes
31	Dec 1997	Nottingham	John Brookfield et al.	Yes
30	Dec 1996	Edinburgh	Deborah Charlesworth	Yes
29	Jan 1996	Bangor	Chris Gliddon	Yes
28	Jan 1995	Exeter	Mark MacNair	Yes
27	Dec 1993	Reading	Mark Beaumont	Yes
26	Jan 1993	Cardiff	Roger Butlin	Yes
25	Dec 1991	Leiden	Paul Brakefield	Yes
24	Jan 1991	Manchester	Mani	Yes
23	Dec 1989	Nottingham	David Parkin & Tom Day	Yes
22	Jan 1989	Leicester	Gabby Dover	Yes
21	Jan 1988	UCL	Steve Jones	Yes
20	Dec 1986	Nottingham	David Parkin & Tom Day	Yes
19	Dec 1985	Exeter		Yes
18	Jan 1985	Manchester		Yes
17	Jan 1984	Southampton	John Allen	Yes
16	Jan 1983	Birmingham	Jeff Gale	Yes
15	Jan 1982	Cambridge	Nick Barton	Yes
14	Dec 1980	Edinburgh	Bill Hill	Yes
13	Jan 1980	Sussex	Brian and Deborah Charlesworth	Yes
12	Dec 1978	Sheffield	Barry Burnet	
11	Jan 1978	Nottingham	Bryan Clarke?	
10	Dec 1976	Durham		
09	Dec 1975	Manchester		
08	Dec 1974	Sussex	John Maynard Smith	
07	Dec 1973	Swansea	Roger Gilbert	
06	Dec 1972	Nottingham		
05	Dec 1971	Bangor	Richard Arnold	
04	Dec 1970	London		Yes
03	Dec 1969	Liverpool		Yes
02	Dec 1968	Edinburgh		Yes
01	Jan 1968	Birmingham		Yes
0	Jan 1967	York	Cepaea only - PopGroup proposed	Yes
-1	Dec 1962	Groningen	Beardmore/Cain/Ruiter/Sheppard	Yes

== Notes ==
^α Held virtually due to the COVID-19 pandemic
