= Tanja Schwander =

Swiss evolutionary biologist

- Born: 1978; Brugg, Switzerland
- Education: University of Lausanne
- Awards: John Maynard Smith Prize
- Scientific career
- Fields: Evolutionary biologist
- Workplaces: University of Lausanne
- Doctoral advisor: Laurent Keller

Tanja Schwander (born 1978) is a Swiss evolutionary biologist and professor at the University of Lausanne. She is known for her work on the evolution of sexual reproduction. She was awarded the John Maynard Smith Prize by the European Society for Evolutionary Biology in 2009. She serves on the Swiss National Academy of Sciences Board of the Platform Biology, and is the secretary of the Swiss Zoological Society.

== Education and career ==
Tanja Schwander was born in 1978 in Brugg in Switzerland. She obtained her PhD in 2007 from the University of Lausanne on 'Evolution, maintenance and ecological consequences of genetic caste determination in Pogonomyrmex harvester ants'. Tanja Schwander then took a postdoctoral position at Simon Fraser University in Prof. Bernard J. Crespi's lab, before being hired as an independent researcher at the University of Groningen. In 2013, she moved back to University of Lausanne to begin her own research group. She is an elected member of the Swiss National Academy of Sciences Board of the Platform Biology from 2023 until the end of 2025. Schwander is secretary of the Swiss Zoological Society.

== Work ==
Tanja Schwander's work has focused on understanding the consequences of asexuality using Timema stick insects as a model system. Her work has contributed to the current understanding of the evolution of sexual reproduction, the paradox of sex, and sexual conflict. With Marc Robinson-Rechavi at the University of Lausanne, she co-led research, published in Science Advances in 2022, that showed asexually-reproducing stick insects cannot adapt to changing conditions as fast as sexually-reproducing stick insects, leading to a reduction in the species' genetic diversity.

== Awards ==
- 2009. John Maynard Smith Prize of the European Society for Evolutionary Biology
- 2020. European Research Council Consolidator Grant

== Notable publications ==
- "Molecular evidence for ancient asexuality in Timema stick insects", Current Biology
- "Deleterious mutation accumulation in asexual Timema stick insects", Molecular Biology and Evolution
- "Neutral and selection-driven decay of sexual traits in asexual stick insects", Proceedings of the Royal Society B: Biological Sciences
- "Consequences of asexuality in natural populations: insights from stick insects", Molecular Biology and Evolution
