= Richard A. Nichols =

Richard Nichols
- Education: University College London; University of East Anglia (PhD)
- Known for: Balding–Nichols model
- Scientific career
- Workplaces: Queen Mary University of London
- Thesis: The ecological genetics of a hybrid zone in an alpine grasshopper (Podisma pedestris) (1984)
- Doctoral advisor: Godfrey Hewitt

Richard Alan Nichols FLS is a British evolutionary biologist and Professor of Evolutionary Genetics at Queen Mary University of London. He is known for the Balding–Nichols model and the Beaumont and Nichols method for detecting natural selection. He developed statistical methods to allow the accurate use of DNA fingerprinting in criminal justice. He co-led a ground-breaking study that detected natural selection acting on ash dieback resistance, a highly polygenic trait.

Richard Nichols was Editor-in-Chief of Heredity (journal) from 2004 to 2009. He was succeeded by Roger Butlin.

He graduated with a first-class degree in zoology from University College London in 1981 and completed his PhD at the University of East Anglia in 1984 under the supervision of Godfrey Hewitt.

== Selected publications ==
- Beaumont & Nichols (1996) Evaluating loci for use in the genetic analysis of population structure
- Balding & Nichols (1995) A method for quantifying differentiation between populations at multi-allelic loci and its implications for investigating identity and paternity
- Balding & Nichols (1994) DNA profile match probability calculation: how to allow for population stratification, relatedness, database selection and single bands
- Byrne & Nichols (1999) Culex pipiens in London underground tunnels: differentiation between surface and subterranean populations
- Groombridge, Jones, Bruford & Nichols (2000) Ghost alleles of the Mauritius kestrel
- Metheringham, Plumb, Flynn, Stocks, Kelly, Nemesio Gorriz, Grieve, Moat, Lines, Buggs & Nichols. Rapid polygenic adaptation in a wild population of ash trees under a novel fungal epidemic
