= Alan Moore (disambiguation) =

Alan Moore (born 1953) is an English writer, best known for his work in comics.

Alan, Allan or Allen Moore may also refer to:

- Alan Moore (drummer) (born 1950), drummer who played for Judas Priest on their album Sad Wings of Destiny
- Alan Moore (footballer) (born 1974), Irish footballer
- Alan Moore (poet) (born 1960), Irish writer and poet
- Alan Moore (sports administrator) (born 1973), Irish semi-professional football player and sports journalist
- Alan W. Moore (born 1951), American art historian and activist
- Allan Moore (born 1964), Scottish footballer
- A. Al Moore (1915–1991), American football player
- Alan Moore (war artist) (1914–2015), Australian war artist
- Allen F. Moore (1869–1945), U.S. representative from Illinois
- Allen J. Moore (born 1958), American geneticist
- Sir Alan Hilary Moore, 2nd Baronet (1882–1959), British writer and surgeon
- Alan Moore, TV sitcom character portrayed by Richard Beckinsale, see Rising Damp#Alan Moore

== See also ==
- Moore (surname)
