= Tanja Stadler =

German mathematician and professor of computational evolution

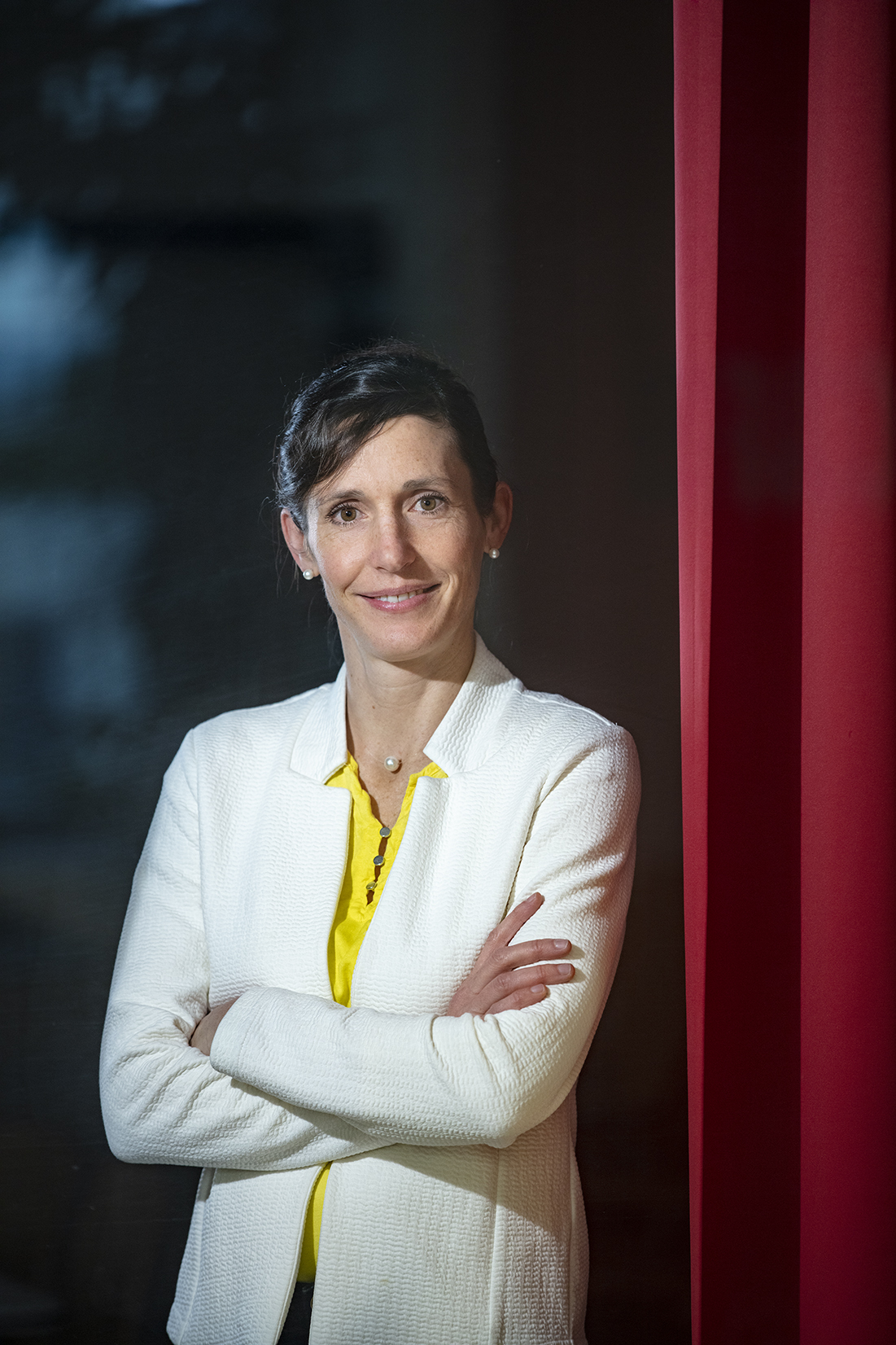
- Stadler in 2023
- Born: 1981; Stuttgart, Germany
- Scientific career
- Fields: Phylogenetics
- Workplaces: ETH Zürich

Tanja Stadler is a mathematician and professor of computational evolution at the Swiss Federal Institute of Technology (ETH Zurich). She's the current president of the Swiss Scientific Advisory Panel COVID-19 and Vize-Chair of the Department of Biosystems Science and Engineering at ETH Zürich.

== Career ==
Tanja Stadler studied applied mathematics and statistics at the Technical University of Munich, University of Cardiff, and the University of Canterbury. She continued at the Technical University of Munich to obtain a PhD in 2008 on the topic 'Evolving Trees – Models for Speciation and Extinction in Phylogenetics' (with Prof. Anusch Taraz and Prof. Mike Steel). After a postdoctoral period with Prof. Sebastian Bonhoeffer in the Department of Environmental Systems Sciences at ETH Zürich, she was promoted to Junior Group Leader at ETH Zürich in 2011. In 2014, she became an assistant professor at the Department of Biosystems Science and Engineering of ETH Zürich, where she was promoted to associate professor in 2017 and to full professor in 2021.

== Research ==
=== Scientific Contributions ===
Tanja's research addresses core questions in the life sciences through an evolutionary perspective, in particular in macroevolution, epidemiology, developmental biology and immunology. Her research questions include fundamental aspects such as how speciation processes led to the current biodiversity, as well as questions directly relevant to human societies, such as the spread of pathogens like COVID-19 or Ebola. Tanja assesses these questions by developing and applying statistical phylodynamic tools to estimate evolutionary and population dynamics from genomic sequencing data while in parallel leading consortia to produce such data. Her unique approach is an innovative mix of mathematics, computer science and biology.

Tanja made major theoretical contributions to the field of phylodynamics by developing statistical frameworks to use birth-death processes in the context of phylogenetic trees. In particular, she laid the foundations to account for sampling through time in birth-death models – enabling coherent analysis of genetic sequencing data collected through time during epidemics as well as coherent analysis of fossil (collected sequentially through time) and present-day species data.

Tanja used this framework for example to quantify HCV spread, the spread of Ebola during the 2014 outbreak, assess Zika spread, to show that influenza waves in a city are majorly driven by travel patterns, and to provide real-time information during the COVID-19 pandemic. In macroevolution, Tanja explored in particular the impact of dinosaur extinction on mammal diversification. Most recently, she is introducing statistical tree thinking into developmental biology.

Her group founded "Taming the BEAST", in 2016. BEAST 2 is a widely used Bayesian phylogenetic software platform allowing to infer evolutionary and population dynamics from genomic sequencing data to which Tanja's team contributed many package. "Taming the BEAST" is both an international workshop series and an online resource, to teach the usage of BEAST 2.

In the field of epidemiology, Tanja is currently spear-heading the use of wastewater information to understand pathogen spread. She is principal investigator of a project between ETH Zürich and Eawag. Her team is estimating the reproductive number for SARS-CoV-2 and influenza from wastewater and contributes to understanding variant dynamics.

=== Outreach and political engagement ===
During the COVID-19 pandemic, Tanja was president of the Swiss National COVID-19 Science task force advising the authorities and decision makers of Switzerland from August 2021 until the termination of the task force in March 2022. She started the presidency after having been a member and later chaired the data & modelling group of the task force. She was responsible for the weekly communication of the pandemic situation to the Swiss Federal Government and the corresponding authorities. In addition, she presented scientific insights in briefings with the complete Federal Government and with members of the executive branches of the Federal and Cantonal Governments, as well as with different divisions of the Swiss Parliament.

Tanja actively contributed core scientific insights to the Task Force. Her daily calculations of the reproductive number became a key part of the epidemic monitoring. The reproductive numbers were employed in the national "Ordinance of 19 June 2020 on Measures during the Special Situation to combat the COVID-19 Epidemic". Further, the reproductive number dashboard was highlighted when the South Africa Health department informed the world about the new variant Omicron. Tanja also lead the most extensive Swiss-based SARS-CoV-2 sequencing effort providing results on the emergence and spread of new variants. Through this effort, the first beta, gamma, and delta variants in Switzerland were detected.

The platform cov-spectrum is developed by Tanja's team and became essential in SARS-CoV-2 variant tracking. It is widely used to facilitate SARS-CoV-2 lineage designation and used in policy such as the FDA advisory committee meeting discussing possible SARS-CoV-2 strains for a vaccine update. During the mpox outbreak, the team launched mpox-spectrum within days to track the newly spreading virus.

In addition to advising the government and informing policy makers, she became actively involved in informing the public about the situation of the pandemic. Tanja communicated the scientific insights often on national news and national TV shows in Switzerland, as well as through Federal press conferences.

== Personal life ==
Stadler lives with her partner and their two daughters in Basel.

== Awards and honors ==
- 2008. TUM PhD award
- 2012. John Maynard Smith Prize of the European Society for Evolutionary Biology
- 2013. ERC starting grant
- 2013. ETH Latsis Prize
- 2013. Zonta prize
- 2016. ETH Golden Owl for teaching
- 2021: SMBE Mid-Career Excellence Award.
- 2021: Carus Prize of the German National Academy of Sciences Leopoldina
- 2022: Rössler Prize
- 2022: Highly cited researcher by Clarivate
- 2023: Member German National Academy of Sciences Leopoldina
