= David Balding =

Australian statistician

David Balding FAA is Professor of Statistical Genetics at the University of Melbourne, and Director of Melbourne Integrative Genomics (MIG), having previously been the founding senior appointment at the UCL Genetics Institute in London. He was educated at the University of Newcastle, Australia, and the University of Oxford, UK, and is editor of the Handbook of Statistical Genetics.

Balding is best known for the Balding–Nichols forensic DNA match probability formula, widely used around the world to evaluate weight of evidence for DNA profile evidence allowing for shared ancestry between the alleged and alternative contributors. His is also known for the Balding–Nichols model of allele frequencies in structured populations and as one of the founders of the approximate Bayesian computation method of statistical inference.

As Director of MIG, he leads a team developing statistical and computational methods for the analysis of genomics data—with applications in medicine, biology, agriculture and forensics.

Balding was elected Fellow of the Australian Academy of Science in 2019.
