= Roger Butlin =

British evolutionary biologist

Roger Kenneth Butlin
- Born: 1955
- Citizenship: British
- Education: University of Cambridge (BSc) University of Nottingham (PhD)
- Awards: Darwin Wallace Medal, 2015.
- Scientific career
- Fields: Evolutionary biologist
- Workplaces: University of Sheffield University of Gothenburg
- Thesis: The maintenance of an inversion polymorphism in Coelopa frigida (1983)
- Doctoral advisor: Tom Day

Roger Kenneth Butlin is a British evolutionary biologist and professor at the University of Sheffield. He is known for his work on speciation. He served as Editor of Heredity from 2009 to 2012, and President of the European Society for Evolutionary Biology from 2013 to 2015. In 2015 he received the Darwin Wallace Medal from the Linnean Society and was appointed as a Distinguised Fellow of the European Society for Evolutionary Biology in 2019.. He is currently interim editor of the Biological Journal of the Linnean Society.

== Education and career ==
Butlin studied Natural Sciences at Jesus College at the University of Cambridge, graduating in 1976. He obtained his PhD in 1983 from the University of Nottingham working in the lab of Tom Day. Butlin then took a postdoctoral position in Godfrey Hewitt's lab for two years at the University of East Anglia In 1987 Butlin took a Royal Society Research Fellowship position at the University of Wales in Cardiff. In 1992 he became a lecturer at the University of Leeds and from 1994 as reader for evolutionary biology. He was a professor at the University of Sheffield and University of Gothenburg until his retirement in 2025.

== Work ==
Butlin's work is concerned with understanding the genetics of speciation, focusing on reproductive isolation. As a model system, he examines insects and their acoustic and chemical signals, the inheritance of signal characteristics and female preferences. Besides insects, he also studies speciation and adaptation in periwinkles (Littorina). His work has contributed greatly to our current understanding of Ecological speciation.

== Selected publications ==
- "What do we need to know about speciation?", Trends Ecol Evol
- "Reinforcement: an idea evolving", Trends Ecol Evol
- "The costs and benefits of sex: new insights from old asexual lineages." Nature Reviews Genetics
- "Variation in female mate preference across a grasshopper hybrid zone."Journal of Evolutionary Biology
- "Coupling, Reinforcement, and Speciation".The American Naturalist
- "Male spermatophore investment increases female fecundity in a grasshopper. Evolution
- "A framework for comparing processes of speciation in the presence of gene flow." Molecular Ecology
