= Michael G. Ritchie =

British evolutionary biologist (born 1962)

Michael Gordon Ritchie
- Born: 1962; Dundee, Scotland
- Education: University of East Anglia
- Scientific career
- Fields: Evolutionary biologist
- Workplaces: University of St Andrews
- Thesis: A Pyrenean hybrid zone in the grasshopper Chorthippus parallelus (Orthoptera: Acrididae) : Descriptive and evolutionary studies (1988)
- Doctoral advisor: Godfrey Hewitt

Michael Gordon Ritchie is a British evolutionary biologist and professor at the University of St Andrews. He is known for his work on speciation. He served as editor-in-chief of the Journal of Evolutionary Biology from 2011 to 2017, and Vice-President of the Society for the Study of Evolution from 2004 to 2005.

== Education and career ==
Ritchie obtained his PhD in 1988 from the University of East Anglia working in the lab of Godfrey Hewitt. Ritchie then took a postdoctoral position in Godfrey Hewitt's lab for two years, before taking a postdoctoral position in Charalambos Kyriacou's lab at the University of Leicester. Ritchie then moved to the University of St Andrews where he has been a professor since 2012.

== Work ==
Ritchie's work has focused on understanding the genetic basis of traits influencing reproductive isolation between species. His work has contributed to our current understanding of Speciation and Sexual selection.

He has an h-index of 53 according to Google Scholar.

== Notable publications ==
- "Sexual Selection and Speciation" Annu Rev Ecol Evol Syst
- "What do we need to know about speciation?", Trends Ecol Evol,
- "Variation in female mate preference across a grasshopper hybrid zone", Journal of Evolutionary Biology
- "Do quantitative trait loci (QTL) for a courtship song difference between Drosophila simulans and D. sechellia coincide with candidate genes and intraspecific QTL?", Genetics
- "Drosophila song as a species-specific mating signal and the behavioural importance of Kyriacou & Hall cycles in D. melanogaster song", Animal Behaviour
- "Mating system manipulation and the evolution of sex-biased gene expression in Drosophila", Nature Communications
