= Laurent Keller =

Swiss scientist

- Born: 28 February 1961 (age 65); Canton of Vaud, Switzerland
- Education: University of Lausanne
- Awards: Marcel Benoist Prize (2015)
- Scientific career
- Fields: Myrmecologist
- Workplaces: University of Lausanne (1996–2023)
- Doctoral students: Tanja Schwander

Laurent Keller (born 28 February 1961) is a Swiss evolutionary biologist, myrmecologist and author. He is known for his influential work on the behavior, genetics and ecology of social insects, particularly ants. His research has significantly advanced the understanding of social evolution, altruism cooperation, aging, reproductive systems, invasive species, and social organization of social insects. He has published numerous scientific articles and written and edited several books on these subjects.

Keller was a professor at the University of Lausanne from 1996 to 2023 where he established a highly regarded academic career spanning nearly three decades. He received numerous honors, including the Latsis prize in 2000, the EO Wilson Naturalist Award in 2005, and the Marcel Benoist Prize in 2015.

== Early life ==
Keller was born and raised in the French-speaking part of Switzerland. He studied biology at the University of Lausanne where he completed his bachelor's, master's and doctoral degrees. He subsequently held several positions, including as a research associate at the Laboratory of Entomology of the University Paul-Sabatier in Toulouse, a post-doctoral research position at the Museum of Comparative Zoology at Harvard University, and a START fellowship (Swiss Talent for Academic Research and Teaching) shared between the University of Bern University of Bern and the University of Lausanne.

== Career ==
Keller joined the University of Lausanne as an Associate Professor in 1996, became head of the Institute of Ecology in 1998 and was promoted to Full Professor of Evolutionary Ecology in 2000. He served as head of the Department of Ecology and Evolution. from 2000 to 2018.

In August 2013, he was elected president of the European Society for Evolutionary Biology and served in that office from 2015 to 2017. For a time, he served as a member of the Editorial Board for Current Biology.

In 2023, Keller left his position at the University of Lausanne for undisclosed reasons. Three researchers from his department alleged sexual harassment before his departure. In August 2024, the Neue Zürcher Zeitung published an article reporting that Keller had reached an out-of-court settlement with the University while noting that the reasons for his departure remained undisclosed.

== Research ==
Laurent Keller has contributed to the study of the evolution of eusociality in ants with numerous scientific publications in peer-reviewed journals, invited talks and seminars, and appearances in the media (press, radio, and television).

His research group is aiming to "understand the principles governing the evolution of animal societies and the ecological and evolutionary consequences of social life" (Group Keller at the University of Lausanne). Disciplines in which members of his research group are active include animal behaviour, ecology, evolutionary genetics, and genomics.

His contributions include over 300 scientific articles in peer-reviewed journals, book chapters in scientific textbooks, and three books such as:

- Le monde des fourmis. 2006. L. Keller & E. Gordon, Odile Jacob, Paris, 303 pp. The book The Lives of Ants was translated in English and published by Oxford University Press.
- Levels of Selection in Evolution. 1999. L. Keller (ed.), Princeton University Press, Princeton, 318 pp.
- Queen Number and Sociality in Insects. 1993. L. Keller (ed.), Oxford University Press, Oxford, 439 pp.

== See also ==
- Myrmecology
- Eusociality
- Ants
- Entomology
- Evolution
- Ecology
