= Niche (video game) =

2017 video game

Niche: A Genetics Survival Game
- Developer: Stray Fawn Studio
- Publisher: Stray Fawn Studio
- Platforms: Linux, macOS, Windows
- Release: 21 September 2017
- Genre: Simulation
- Mode: Single-player

Niche: A Genetics Survival Game is a simulation video game developed and published by Stray Fawn Studio, an independent video game developer and publisher. The game entered early access for Windows, OS X, and Linux-based systems in September 2016 after a successful Kickstarter crowd-funding campaign and was released in September 2017. Its main aim is to breed certain traits or genes into a group of canine or feline creatures to make the pack genetically perfect for its environment.

== Gameplay ==
The game starts off with the player choosing story mode, a quick how-to tutorial or sandbox mode, where the player chooses their animals and terrain for their tribes and environment and a short cut-scene of a tribe of "nichelings" living on an island. A large bird takes a child niche and tries to fly off with him but he falls onto a random island. This starts off the game by playing as a "nicheling" named Adam and the tutorial level. Game play and turns are organized into "days" which gives each animal a few actions of play each day.

Niche's game mechanics were inspired by population genetics and effectively provide what is considered a fairly realistic genetic gaming experience. Animals can perish due to illness, injury, and even old age, so learning what will help them thrive with consideration to their living environment is key to not only building a solid tribe, but winning the game as well. Niche simulates over 100 genes, houses 4 different biomes with each having their very own predators, plants, and prey. Within the 100 available genes, there are characteristic options which a player can choose in order to realistically develop their own animal species, some of which detail physical characteristics, disease immunity, fertility, and overall dexterity. There are additional genetic options available as the player unlocks and utilizes new environments and events in-game.

== Development ==
Niche was crowdfunded on Kickstarter. It was inspired by Creatures, Spore, and Don't Starve. It entered early access in 2016. Stray Fawn did not advertise Niche during early access and charged a higher price than at release. Stray Fawn reasoned that this would build a dedicated and engaged community. The world and all the animals are procedurally generated. It was released on 21 September 2017. In 2019, Niche was made free for educational use in schools.

== Reception ==
Zachary Miller, an associate editor at Nintendo World Report, states that the game seems geared more towards science and learning than about gaming. Miller likens this genetics driven game to North Star Games' Evolution tabletop game, and wonders where the creative charm is, and notes that the format is clearly developed for PC play and not handheld action because of the many "mouse over" prompts that are filtered into the menu. Miller found the game to be generic in totality and fairly uninteresting.

== Niche - Breed and Evolve ==
Niche also expanded to mobile, publishing a spin-off game Niche - Breed and Evolve on 23 June 2021. The game is 2D and similarly to the main game the player takes control of "nichelings" with which they can hunt, forage, and fight off predators. It is currently available for iOS and Android.
