= Balding–Nichols model =

Model in population genetics

Balding-Nichols
- Probability density function

- Cumulative distribution function
- Parameters: $0 < F < 1$(real) $0< p < 1$ (real); For ease of notation, let $\alpha=\tfrac{1-F}{F}p$, and $\beta=\tfrac{1-F}{F}(1-p)$
- Support: $x \in (0; 1)\!$
- PDF: $\frac{x^{\alpha-1}(1-x)^{\beta-1}} {\mathrm{B}(\alpha,\beta)}\!$
- CDF: $I_x(\alpha,\beta)\!$
- Mean: $p\!$
- Median: $I_{0.5}^{-1}(\alpha,\beta)$ no closed form
- Mode: $\frac{F-(1-F)p}{3F-1}$
- Variance: $Fp(1-p)\!$
- Skewness: $\frac{2F(1-2p)}{(1+F)\sqrt{F(1-p)p}}$
- MGF: $1 +\sum_{k=1}^{\infty} \left( \prod_{r=0}^{k-1} \frac{\alpha+r}{\frac{1-F}{F}+r}\right) \frac{t^k}{k!}$
- CF: ${}_1F_1(\alpha; \alpha+\beta; i\,t)\!$

In population genetics, the Balding–Nichols model is a statistical description of the allele frequencies in the components of a sub-divided population. With background allele frequency p the allele frequencies, in sub-populations separated by Wright's F_{ST} F, are distributed according to independent draws from

$$B\left(\frac{1-F}{F}p,\frac{1-F}{F}(1-p)\right)$$

where B is the Beta distribution. This distribution has mean p and variance Fp(1 – p).

The model is due to David Balding and Richard Nichols and is widely used in the forensic analysis of DNA profiles and in population models for genetic epidemiology.
