= Darwin–Wallace Medal =

Medal awarded by the Linnean Society

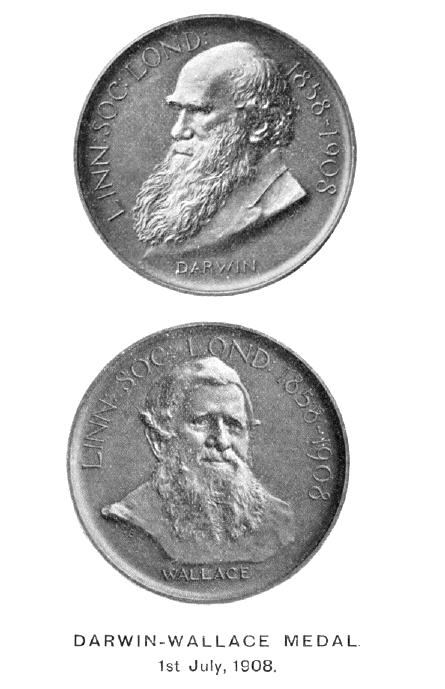
The Darwin–Wallace Medal

The Darwin–Wallace Medal is a medal awarded by the Linnean Society of London for "major advances in evolutionary biology". Historically, the medals have been awarded every 50 years, beginning in 1908. That year marked 50 years after the joint presentation by Charles Darwin and Alfred Russel Wallace of two scientific papers—On the Tendency of Species to form Varieties; and on the Perpetuation of Varieties and Species by Natural Means of Selection—to the Linnean Society of London on 1 July 1858. Fittingly, Wallace was one of the first recipients of the medal, in his case it was, exceptionally, in gold, rather than the silver version presented in the six other initial awards. However, in 2008 the Linnean Society announced that due to the continuing importance of evolutionary research, the medal will be awarded on an annual basis beginning in 2010.

== Awardees ==
=== 1908 ===
The first award was of a gold medal to Alfred Russel Wallace, and silver medals to six other distinguished scientists:

- Joseph Dalton Hooker
- August Weismann
- Ernst Haeckel
- Francis Galton
- E. Ray Lankester
- Eduard Strasburger

=== 1958 ===
20 silver medals were awarded:

- Edgar Anderson
- E. Pavlovsky
- Maurice Caullery
- Bernhard Rensch
- Ronald A. Fisher
- G. Gaylord Simpson
- C. R. Florin
- Carl Skottsberg
- Roger Heim
- H. Hamshaw Thomas
- J. B. S. Haldane
- Erik Stensiö
- John Hutchinson
- Göte Turesson
- Julian Huxley
- Victor van Straelen
- Ernst Mayr
- D. M. S. Watson
- H. J. Muller
- John Christopher Willis (posthumously)

=== 2008 ===
13 silver medals were awarded, including 2 posthumously:

- Nick Barton
- M. W. Chase
- Bryan Clarke
- Joseph Felsenstein
- Stephen Jay Gould (posthumously)
- Peter R. Grant
- Rosemary Grant
- James Mallet
- Lynn Margulis
- John Maynard Smith (posthumously)
- Mohamed Noor
- H. Allen Orr
- Linda Partridge

=== From 2010 ===
- Brian Charlesworth (2010)
- James A. Lake (2011)
- Loren H. Rieseberg (2012)
- Godfrey Hewitt (2013)
- Dolph Schluter (2014)
- Roger Butlin (2015)
- Pamela S. Soltis and Douglas E. Soltis (2016)
- John N. Thompson (2017)
- Josephine Pemberton (2018)
- David Reich and Svante Pääbo (2019)
- Spencer Barrett (2020)
- Sarah Otto (2021)
- David Jablonski (2022)
- Ziheng Yang (2023)
- Peter Crane (2024)
- Trudy Mackay (2025)

== See also ==
- List of biology awards
