= Ecology and Evolution =

Scientific journal

- Discipline: Ecology, Evolutionary biology
- Language: English
- Edited by: Allen Moore, Andrew Beckerman

Publication details
- History: 2011–present
- Publisher: Wiley-Blackwell
- Frequency: Biweekly
- Open access: Yes
- Impact factor: 2.91 (2020)

Standard abbreviations
- ISO 4: Ecol. Evol.

Indexing
- ISSN: 2045-7758

Links
- Journal homepage

Ecology and Evolution is a biweekly open-access scientific journal covering all areas of ecology, evolution, and conservation. The Editors in Chief of this journal are Allen Moore, Andrew Beckerman, Jenn Firn, Chris Foote, and Gareth Jenkins.

== Abstracting and Indexing ==
According to the Journal Citation Reports, the journal has a 2021 impact factor of 3.167. The journal is indexed in Web of Science: Science Citation Index Expanded, BIOSIS Previews, Biological Abstracts, and Scopus.
