= John N. Thompson =

American evolutionary biologist (born 1951)

John Norton Thompson (born November 15, 1951) is an American evolutionary biologist. He is Jean H. Langeheim Professor of Plant Ecology and Evolution at the University of California, Santa Cruz.

Thompson is known for his research on coevolution. He proposed the geographic mosaic theory of coevolution.

== Background ==
Thompson was born in Pittsburgh on November 15, 1951. In 1973 he graduated from Washington & Jefferson College in Washington, Pennsylvania with a bachelor's degree and in 1977 received his PhD in ecology from the University of Illinois at Urbana-Champaign. His dissertation was entitled "Patch Dynamics in the Insect - Pastinaca sativa Association: Life History Tactics and Population Consequences."

Afterwards he became Visiting Assistant Professor for Entomology.

In 1978 he became Assistant Professor; 1982 Associate Professor; and 1987 Professor at Washington State University, where from 1994 he was Edward Meyer Distinguished Professor.

In 1991-2 he was a Fulbright Scholar in Canberra, Australia.

In 2000 he became Professor of Ecology and Evolutionary Biology at the University of California, Santa Cruz, where he was Director of the STEPS Institute for Innovation in Environmental Research from 2002 to 2007.

In 2008 he became a Distinguished Professor; and in 2014 was appointed the Jean H. Langeheim Professor of Plant Ecology and Evolution.

In 2014 he was a visiting fellow at Trinity College, Cambridge.

== Awards and recognition ==
In 2008 he was President of the American Society of Naturalists.

In 2017 he received the Darwin-Wallace Medal for his work on coevolution.

He is a Fellow of the American Academy of Arts and Sciences, the American Association for the Advancement of Science, the California Academy of Sciences, and the Royal Entomological Society of London.

He is one of the ISI Highly Cited Researchers in Evolutionary Biology and Ecology.

== Selected bibliography ==
Books:

- Relentless Evolution, University of Chicago Press 2013
- The geographic mosaic of coevolution, University of Chicago Press 2005
- The coevolutionary process, University of Chicago Press 1994
- Interaction and coevolution, University of Chicago Press 1982, 2. 2014

Selected Manuscripts:

- with S. T. A. Pickett: Patch dynamics and the design of nature reserves, Biological Conservation, Band 13, 1978, S. 27–37
- with M. F. Wilson: Evolution of temperate fruit/bird interactions: phenological strategies, Evolution, 1979, S. 973–982
- with E. W. Price u. a.: Interactions among three trophic levels: influence of plants on interactions between insect herbivores and natural enemies, Annual Review of Ecology and Systematics, Band 11, 1980, S. 41–65
- with R. N. Mack: Evolution in steppe with few large, hooved mammals, The American Naturalist, Band 119, 1982, S. 757–773
- with D. A. Pyke: Statistical analysis of survival and removal rate experiments, Ecology, Band 67, 1986, S. 240–245
- with P. W. Price u. a.: Parasite mediation in ecological interactions, Annual Review of Ecology and Systematics, Band 17, 1986, S. 487–505
- Evolutionary ecology of the relationship between oviposition preference and performance of offspring in phytophagous insects, Entomologia experimentalis et applicata, Band 47, 1988, S. 3–14
- Variation in interspecific interactions,. Annual review of ecology and systematics, Band 19, 1988, S. 65–87
- with O. Pellmyr: Evolution of oviposition behavior and host preference in Lepidoptera, Annual review of entomology, Band 36, 1991, S. 65–89
- with J. J. Burdon: Gene-for-gene coevolution between plants and parasites, Nature, Band 360, 1992, S. 121–125
- Rapid evolution as an ecological process, Trends in Ecology & Evolution Band 13, 1998, S. 329–332
- Specific hypotheses on the geographic mosaic of coevolution, The American Naturalist, Band 153, 1999, S1-S14
- The evolution of species interactions, Science, Band 284, 1999, S. 2116–2118
- with A. K. Sakai u. a.: The population biology of invasive species, Annual review of ecology and systematics, Band 32, 2001, S. 305–332
- with B. M. Cunningham: Geographic structure and dynamics of coevolutionary selection, Nature, Band 417, 2002, S. 735
- with Douglas Soltis, Pamela Soltis, D. W. Schemske, J. F. Hancock: Autopolyploidy in angiosperms: have we grossly underestimated the number of species ?, Taxon, Band 56, 2007, S. 13–30
