= Scrib =

Early portable computer made by Bobst Graphics

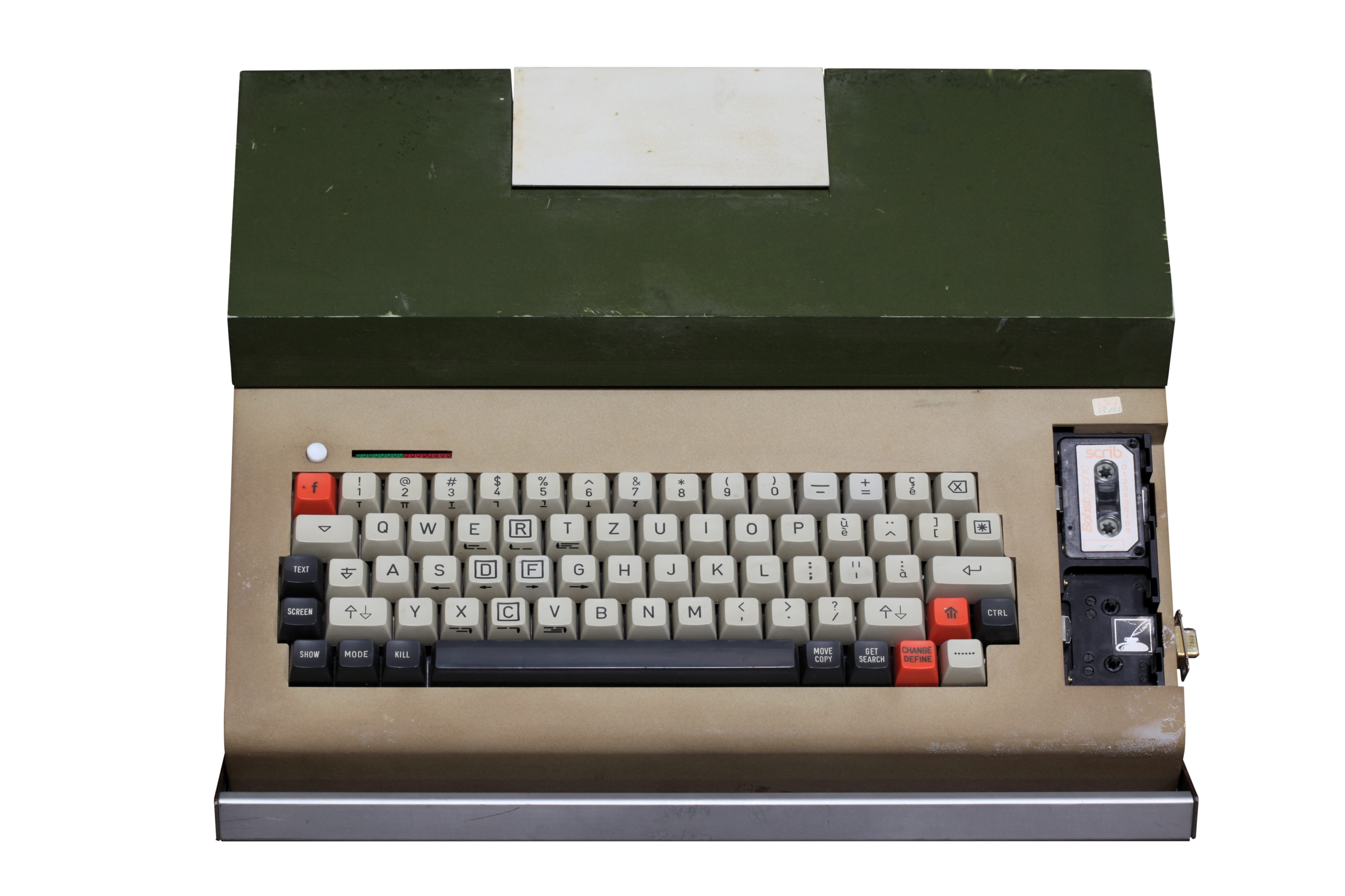
- A Scrib with the screen lid closed and one tape engaged
- Manufacturer: Bobst Graphics
- Type: Portable computer
- Released: January 1978; 48 years ago
- Units shipped: 1000
- Storage: One microcassette.
- Display: Built-in 7-inch green screen monitor
- Weight: 16 kg

The Scrib was an early portable computer made by the Swiss company Bobst Graphics, with support from Jean-Daniel Nicoud.

The Scrib was designed as a portable drafting tool for journalists: it was linked to an acoustic coupler, enabling reporters to send their articles over standard phone landlines. Its integrated tape recorder was able to save up to 8000 characters on a microcassette, with second socket available for quick rewinding of the tape.

The screen was mounted inside the case of the computer, at the rear, and displayed characters which were shown to the user on a foldable mirror.

The Scrib was awarded a design award at the 1978 Wescon Show.

Details
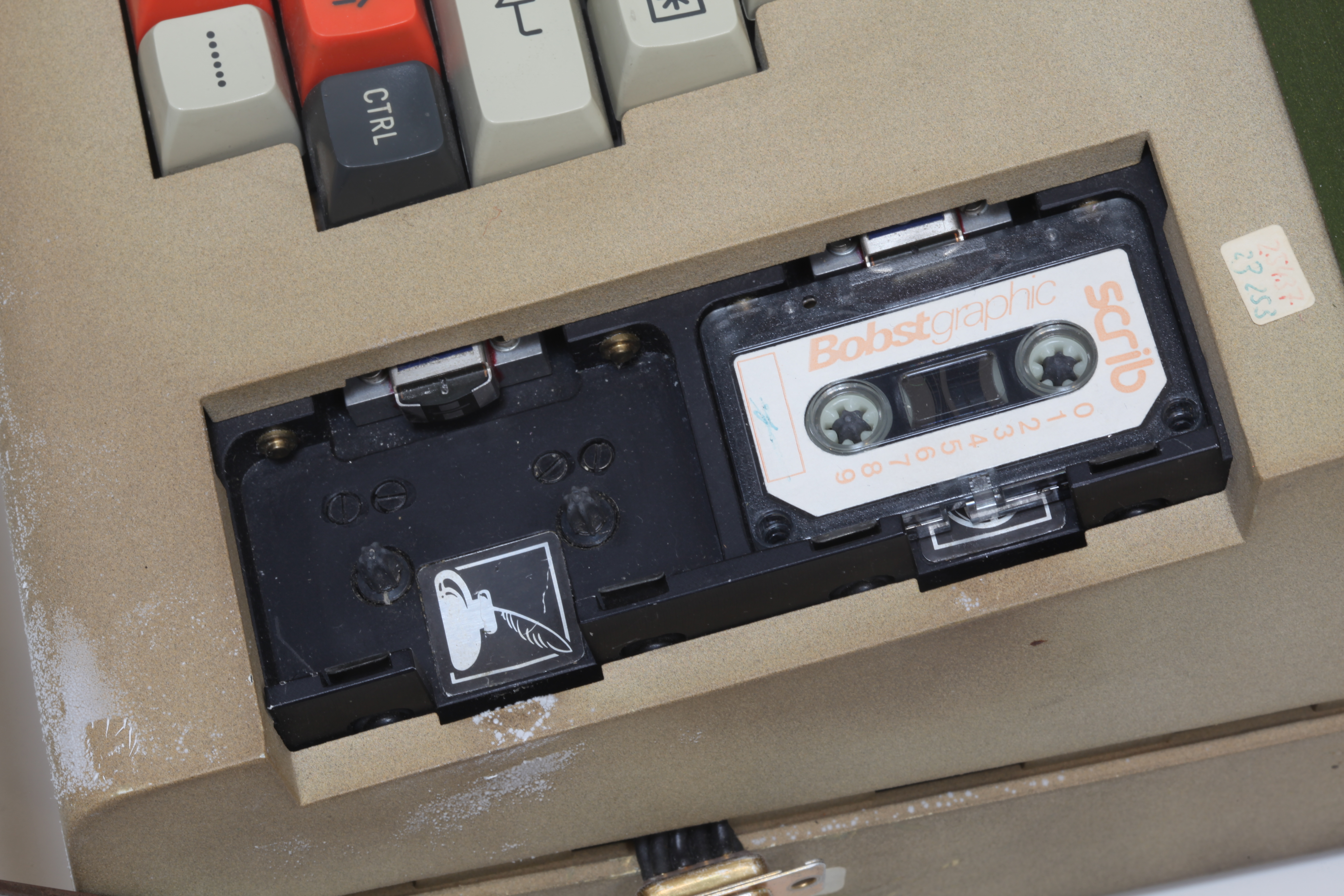
microcassette engaged in the rewind socket

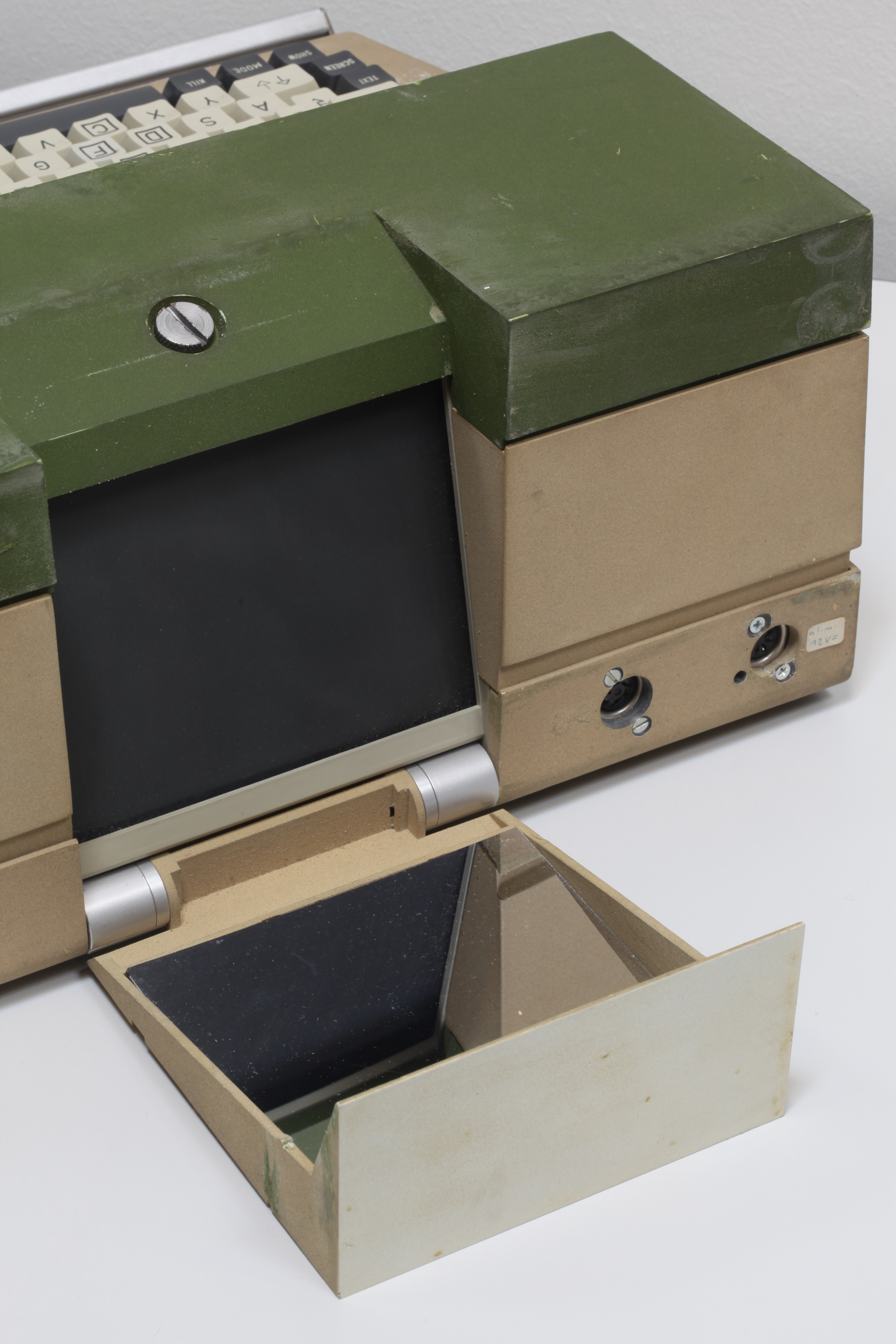
rear screen reflected in the display mirror
