= Mohamed Noor =

American geneticist

Mohamed A. F. Noor
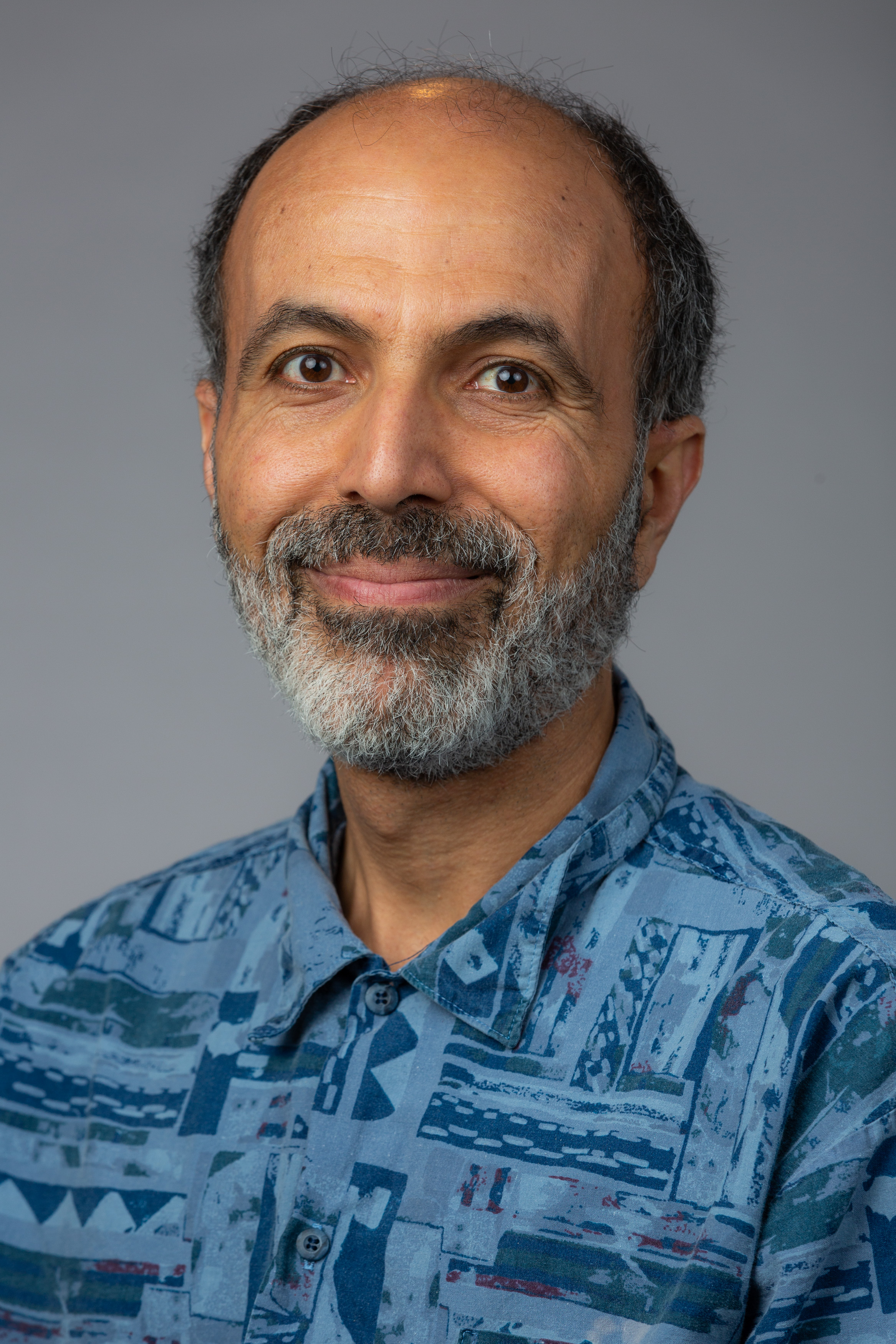
- Noor in 2019
- Education: B.S., Biology; Ph.D., Ecology and Evolution
- Alma mater: College of William & Mary; University of Chicago
- Known for: Evolutionary genetics research Online course in Coursera; Science outreach
- Children: 2
- Awards: Darwin–Wallace Medal; Stephen J. Gould Prize; NCSE Friend of Darwin Award (2021)
- Scientific career
- Fields: Evolutionary biology Genetics; Genomics
- Workplaces: Duke University
- Thesis: The evolution of mating discrimination between Drosophila pseudoobscura and D. persimilis (1996)
- Doctoral advisors: Jerry Coyne
- Website: scholars.duke.edu/person/noor

Mohamed Noor is the Executive Vice Provost and a Professor in the Biology Department at Duke University (formerly holding the rotating titles of Earl D. McLean Professor, department chair, dean of natural sciences, Interim Dean of Arts & Sciences, and Interim Vice Provost for Academic Affairs). His specialties include evolution, genetics and genomics.

Noor has a BS from the College of William and Mary in 1992 and a PhD from University of Chicago (1996), together with a postdoctoral residency at Cornell University (1996–1998). He specializes in Drosophila evolution. His team's research approaches have included both classical genetic mapping, as well as analyses of whole genome sequences.

Likewise, Noor was one of the first scientists to demonstrate by experiment speciation by reinforcement, that is, as a result of natural selection mating preferences diverge against deleterious hybridization and reduce gene flow between species. He is also known for developing (along with others) a model wherein regions of restricted recombination, as by chromosomal inversions, facilitate the persistence of hybridizing species.

Later, his research team has focused on understanding variation in recombination rate within and between species, and its impact on DNA sequence variation.

In 2008, he was awarded the Darwin-Wallace Medal from the Linnean Society of London.

In 2021, he was awarded a Friend of Darwin award by the National Center for Science Education.

He served as editor-in-chief of the international journal Evolution (2016-2019), is or was associate editor for several other journals, and the author of over 100 publications. He has served as president of the American Genetic Association (2012) and Society for the Study of Evolution (2014) and as a board member for the Genetics Society of America.

Noor has been active in education and outreach, receiving numerous teaching and mentoring awards from his institution, and teaching an online course in genetics and evolution. He and his group have also developed laboratory activities for implementation in high schools and colleges, including a commercial kit for observing natural selection in Drosophila. He published a book that uses Star Trek to teach principles in genetics and evolution, and gives classes and talks at various venues using science fiction to teach science. On the side, he also serves as a science consultant for the Star Trek television franchise.

== Recent scientific publications ==
1. Korunes, K. L., C. A. Machado, and M. A. F. Noor. 2021. Inversions shape the divergence of Drosophila pseudoobscura and D. persimilis on multiple timescales. Evolution, 75: 1820-1834. abs.
2. Samuk, K., B. Manzano-Winkler, K. R. Ritz, and M. A. F. Noor. 2020. Natural selection shapes variation in genome-wide recombination rate in Drosophila pseudoobscura. Current Biology, 30: 1517-1528. abs.
3. Korunes, K. L., and M. A. F. Noor. 2017. Gene conversion and linkage: Effects on genome evolution and speciation. Molecular Ecology, 26: 351-364. doi:10.1111/mec.13736. abs

== Popular publications ==
- Noor, Mohamed A. F. (2012). You're Hired! Now What? A Guide for New Science Faculty. Sunderland, Mass.: Sinauer Associates. ISBN 9780878939633.
- Noor, Mohamed A. F. (2018). Live Long and Evolve: What Star Trek Can Teach Us about Evolution, Genetics, and Life on Other Worlds. Princeton, New Jersey: Princeton University Press. ISBN 9780691177410.
