= Gambonanza =

2026 video game

- Developer: Blukulélé
- Publishers: Sidekick Publishing; Stray Fawn Publishing
- Platforms: Windows; Linux; macOS; iOS; Android
- Release: 1 May 2026
- Genre: Roguelike
- Mode: Single-player

Gambonanza is a 2026 turn-based chess roguelike video game developed by Blukulélé and copublished with Sidekick Publishing and Stray Fawn Publishing. The game's goal is to capture every single rival piece instead of just putting the king in checkmate. The game was chosen as part of the SXSW Sydney 2025 Game Festival official selection and was shortlisted for the festival's Game of the Year.

== Gameplay ==
Gameplay screenshot

The game starts with a board smaller than the traditional chess 64 squares board, where the goal is to capture every single rival piece instead of just putting the king in checkmate. If the players wastes too many moves the board will start crumbling.

== Reception ==
Reception

Aggregate scores
Aggregator	Score
Metacritic	(PC) 64/100
OpenCritic	57% recommend (Note: Based on 4 reviews)

Two weeks after Gambonanza's release on May 1, 2026 the game sold over 200,000 units across all platforms. This was a massive hit for Blukulélé as their previous two games failed to sell over 700 units combined. Blukulélé said that they personally earned roughly $220,000 USD after fees, which they describe as "a life-changing success". The PC version of Gambonanza received "mixed or average" reviews from critics, according to the review aggregation website Metacritic. Fellow review aggregator OpenCritic assessed that the game received fair approval, being recommended by 57% of critics.

The game was chosen as part of the SXSW Sydney 2025 Game Festival official selection and was shortlisted for the festival's Game of the Year.

== See also ==
- Balatro
