= Plug & Play (video game) =

2015 video game

- Developers: Michael Frei, Mario von Rickenbach
- Publisher: Etter Studio
- Platforms: Windows, Mac, Linux, iOS, Android
- Release: iOS 20 January 2015 Windows, Mac, Linux 5 March 2015 Android 23 April 2015
- Mode: Single-player

Plug & Play is a 2015 video game developed by Swiss independent developers Michael Frei and Mario von Rickenbach, and published by Etter Studio. It is an interactive art game where players manipulate small figures, whose body parts are made up of plugs and sockets. Plug & Play was based on a short film of the same name animated by Frei in 2013, engaging programmer von Rickenbach to translate it into a game. Upon release, Plug & Play received positive reviews, with many critics viewing the imagery of plugs as a humorous and meaningful metaphor for interpersonal interaction. Following release, the game was nominated for the Nuovo Award at the 2015 Independent Games Festival.

== Gameplay ==
Connection of plugs is a central mechanic and motif of the game.

Players use point and click or touchscreen controls to interact and rearrange a series of characters represented as plugs. To make the characters interact, players manipulate, couple and uncouple their wires or plugs. Many of the interactions between the figures involve resolving humorous or unusual conflicts between the figures, whose plugs and sockets connect with the player's intervention.

== Development and release ==
Plug & Play was a collaboration between Swiss director and animator Michael Frei and designer and programmer Mario von Rickenbach. The game was originally a short film animated by Frei, which premiered in February 2013. Due to minimal funds and frequent travel, Frei developed the visual style for the animation using the touchpad on his laptop, which he would later employ for the game. He stated the concept was about "[building] tension through contrast and opposition" through exploring a "binary world of female and male plugs". Frei later approached von Rickenbach, a game design graduate at the Zurich University of the Arts, seeking to "reach a different audience" by translating the film into an interactive game. The game's visuals were drawn by Frei in Photoshop and programmed by von Rickenbach in Unity. Development occurred over two years, with the process involving a mixture of two- and three-dimensional animation techniques. To achieve this, the developers reconstructed of the film's animations from 12 to 60-second frames, and merged them with "digital puppet" models in the Unity engine to provide the figures with physics. Frei and von Rickenbach would continue to collaborate on a second title, Kids, in 2019.

== Reception ==
Finding the game to be "surprisingly emotional", Andrew Webster of The Verge stated the game was "hard to categorize", but felt it was short and had "little in the way of challenge". Webster also considered the game to be "more like a thought-provoking toy rather than a traditional game". John Walker of Rock Paper Shotgun praised the "original animation" and "pleasing physics [that make] it a tactile experience", although felt the player's involvement was "somewhat limited". Kill Screen discussed the themes of the game, stating that its "strong symbolism and metaphor" conveys "mass communication that has destroyed the distinction between the private and the public" between people "obsessed with fitting in with one another". Describing the title as an art game, Good Game considered Plug & Play to be a "strange experience", but praised the game's humor and stated it made them "ask questions about the nature of human relationships".

=== Accolades ===
Plug & Play was nominated for the Nuovo Award at the Independent Games Festival in 2015.
