= GLtron =

1999 video game

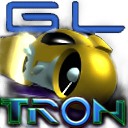
- Original author: Andreas Umbach
- Developer: GLtron.org
- Release: 1999; 27 years ago
- Stable release: 0.72-beta-8 / 31 July 2016; 10 years ago
- Written in: C
- Platform: OS X (OS X 10.7+ currently unsupported), Mac OS 9, Linux, Windows, MorphOS, Symbian, Android
- Type: Snake game
- License: GPL-2.0-or-later
- Website: www.gltron.org
- Repository: sourceforge.net/projects/gltron

GLtron is a 3D snake game based on the light cycle portion of the film Tron. The game is free and open-source software and has been ported to many mobile and non-mobile operating systems such as Windows, MacOS, Symbian and Android over the years.

== Development ==
After being originally a private university project by Andreas Umbach in June 1998, the game's open-source development started when the source code was put to SourceForge around 1999 under the GPL-2.0-or-later software license. The game's soundtrack features the track Revenge of the Cats, which was composed and performed by Finnish musician Peter Hajba, who is also known by his demoscene nickname Skaven. Ports to new platforms are primarily developed by the game's community.

== Gameplay ==
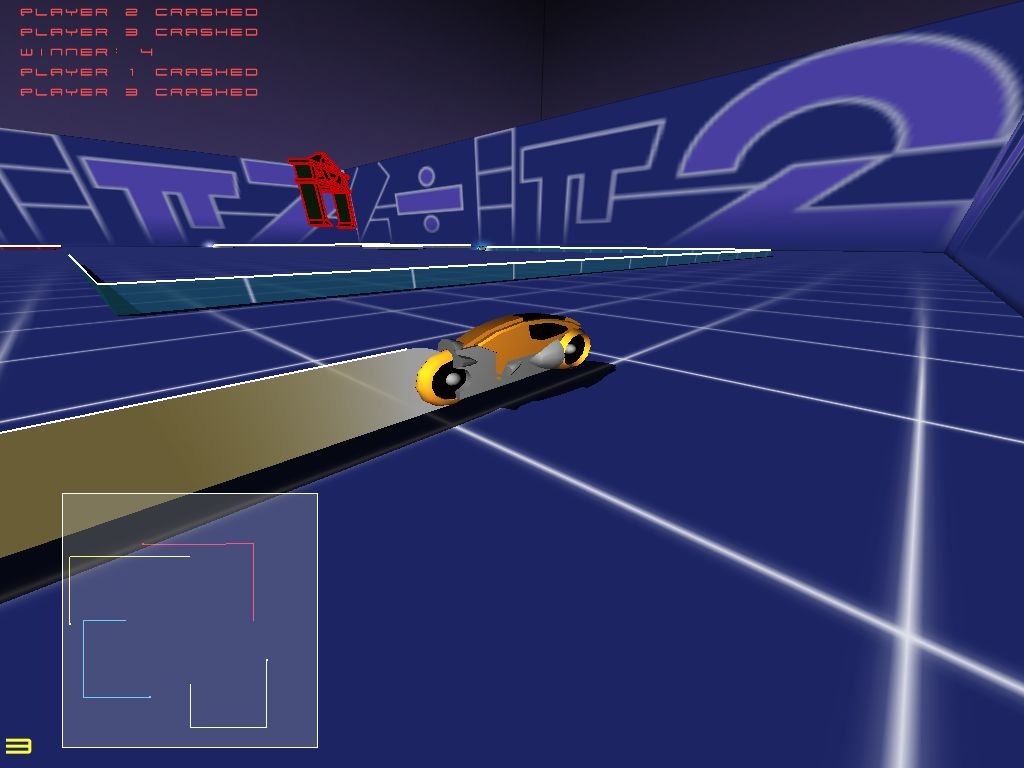
GLTron screenshot: Light cycle and trail

The aim of the game is to be the last player riding. Cycles can be boosted with a limited turbo. There are various gameplay styles, including switching the gameplay from "booster" to "wall accel" to "both". "Booster" has an extra button for boosting, in addition to the standard left, right, glance left, glance right buttons, while "Wall ride" increases a player's light cycle's speed automatically depending on how close they are to an opponent's wall. "Both" incorporates both options for increasing the player's light cycle's speed.

There are several arena sizes that can be selected, from "tiny" (which is best for two players on normal speed or people practicing their reflexes with 3 "mcp himself" difficulty-level bots on "crazy" speed) to "vast".

The game is played using the keyboard to control the vehicle and the mouse to control the camera position, players can out ride competitors across the geometric grid.

== Reception ==
In 2006, GLTron was recommended by The Mac Observer for its graphics and sound, considered good for a free software game, and support for different screen resolutions and input devices. Other reviews were positive too, for instance The Linux Game Tome gave 4/5 stars.

The game was ported to multiple systems like Linux, Windows, MacOS as also mobile systems that have support for OpenGL ES like Symbian, Android,, BlackBerry 10 and as also the OpenPandora handheld. Gltron was downloaded between 2000 and 2016 1,500,000 times from SourceForge alone, while it is also packaged with many Linux distributions like Debian.
