= Jean-Daniel Nicoud =

Swiss computer scientist, inventor (born 1938)

- Born: August 31, 1938 (age 87)
- Citizenship: Swiss
- Education: École Polytechnique Fédérale de Lausanne
- Known for: computer mouse
- Scientific career
- Fields: Software engineering

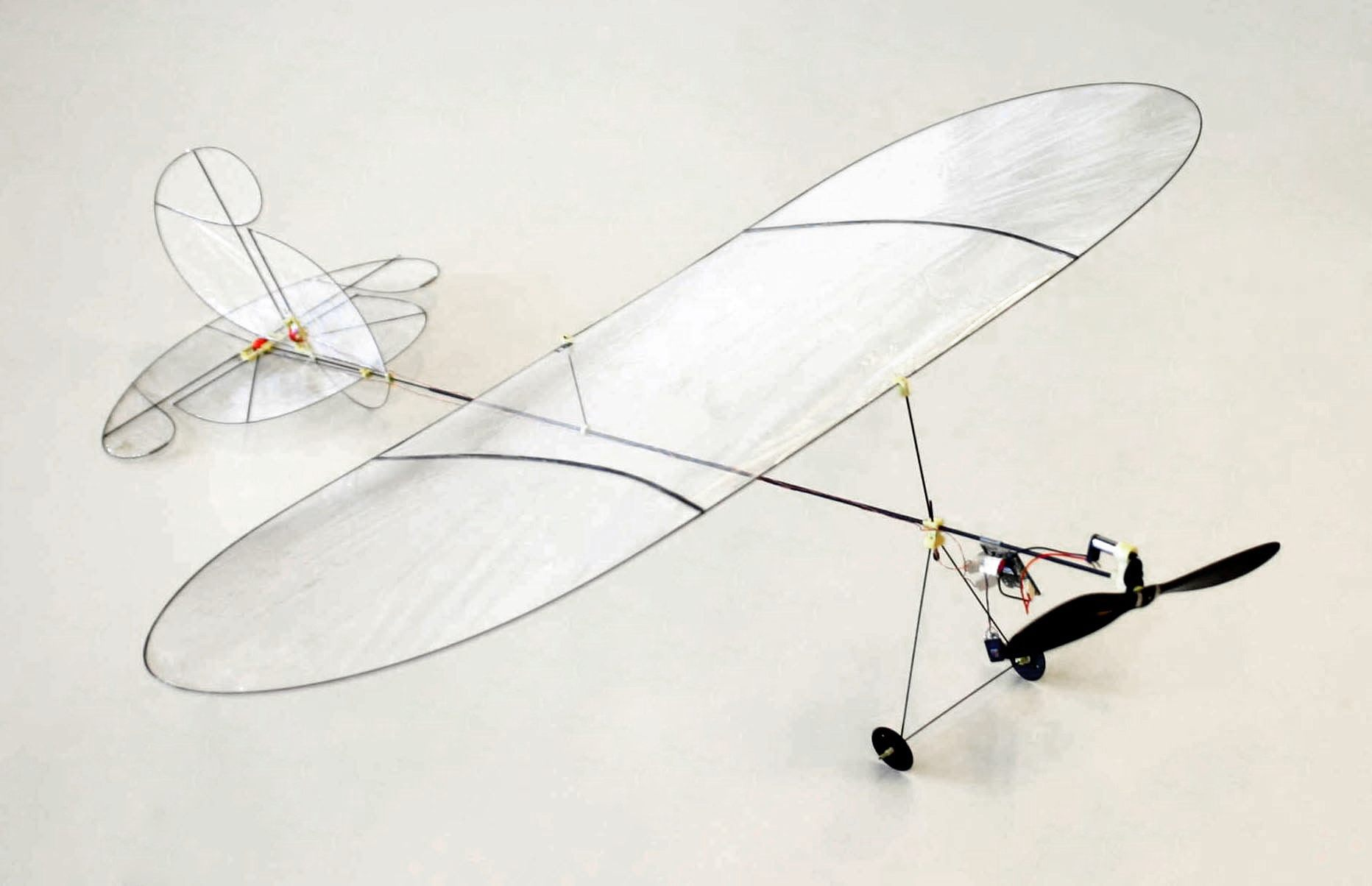
Picture of the miniCeline ultralight aircraft by Jean-Daniel Nicoud. This remote-controlled plane weighs only 6 g and is capable of indoor flying.

Jean-Daniel Nicoud (born 31 August 1938), is a Swiss computer scientist, noted for inventing a computer mouse with an optical encoder and the CALM (Common Assembly Language for microprocessors).

He obtained a degree in physics at the École Polytechnique Fédérale de Lausanne (EPFL) in 1963. Around 1965, he became interested in logical systems. He obtained his PhD at the EPFL in 1970 and became a professor in 1973.

His laboratory, LAMI (LAboratoire de Micro-Informatique), developed the Smaky computer, in addition to the optical computer mouse, an update of the traditional kinetic mouse invented by Douglas Engelbart. The Khepera mobile robot was also developed at the LAMI.

He left the EPFL in August 2000 and is actively innovating in his private company, DIDEL, especially in the area of miniature ultralight aircraft (below 10 g airplanes). His airplane was used in a publication that received a best paper award in IROS 2006 conference.

== See also ==
- Scrib – Early portable computer made by Bobst Graphics
