= Daven Presgraves =

American geneticist

- Scientific career
- Fields: Molecular Genetics
- Workplaces: University of Rochester

Daven Presgraves is University Dean's Professor in the Department of Biology at the University of Rochester.

== Education and career ==
Presgraves earned his B.S. and an M.S. at the University of Maryland at College Park and a second M.S. and a Ph.D. in ecology and evolutionary biology from the University of Rochester. After completing his Ph.D, he was an Alexander von Humboldt Postdoctoral Fellow at LMU Munich and an NIH-NRSA Postdoctoral Fellow at Cornell University.

== Work ==
Presgraves' work has contributed to the current understanding of sexual selection, meiotic drive, and the X-Chromosome's evolutionary importance. His work has led to the confirmation of a phenomenon called the "large X-effect," which describes the integral role of the X-Chromosome as a wedge in driving speciation.

== Awards and recognition ==
In 2003, Presgraves was awarded the Dobzhansky Prize by the Society for the Study of Evolution in recognition of his accomplishments as an outstanding young evolutionary biologist. He was the first Dobzhansky Prize winner to have been trained by a previous recipient of the prize: H. Allen Orr.

== Notable publications ==
- "High-resolution genome-wide dissection of the two rules of speciation in Drosophila", PLoS Biology
- "Recombination enhances protein adaptation in Drosophila melanogaster", Current Biology
- "Adaptive evolution drives divergence of a hybrid inviability gene between two species of Drosophila", Nature
- "Linkage limits the power of natural selection in Drosophila", PNAS
- "Haldane's rule is obeyed in taxa lacking a hemizygous sex", Science
