= Smaky =

Swiss computer brand

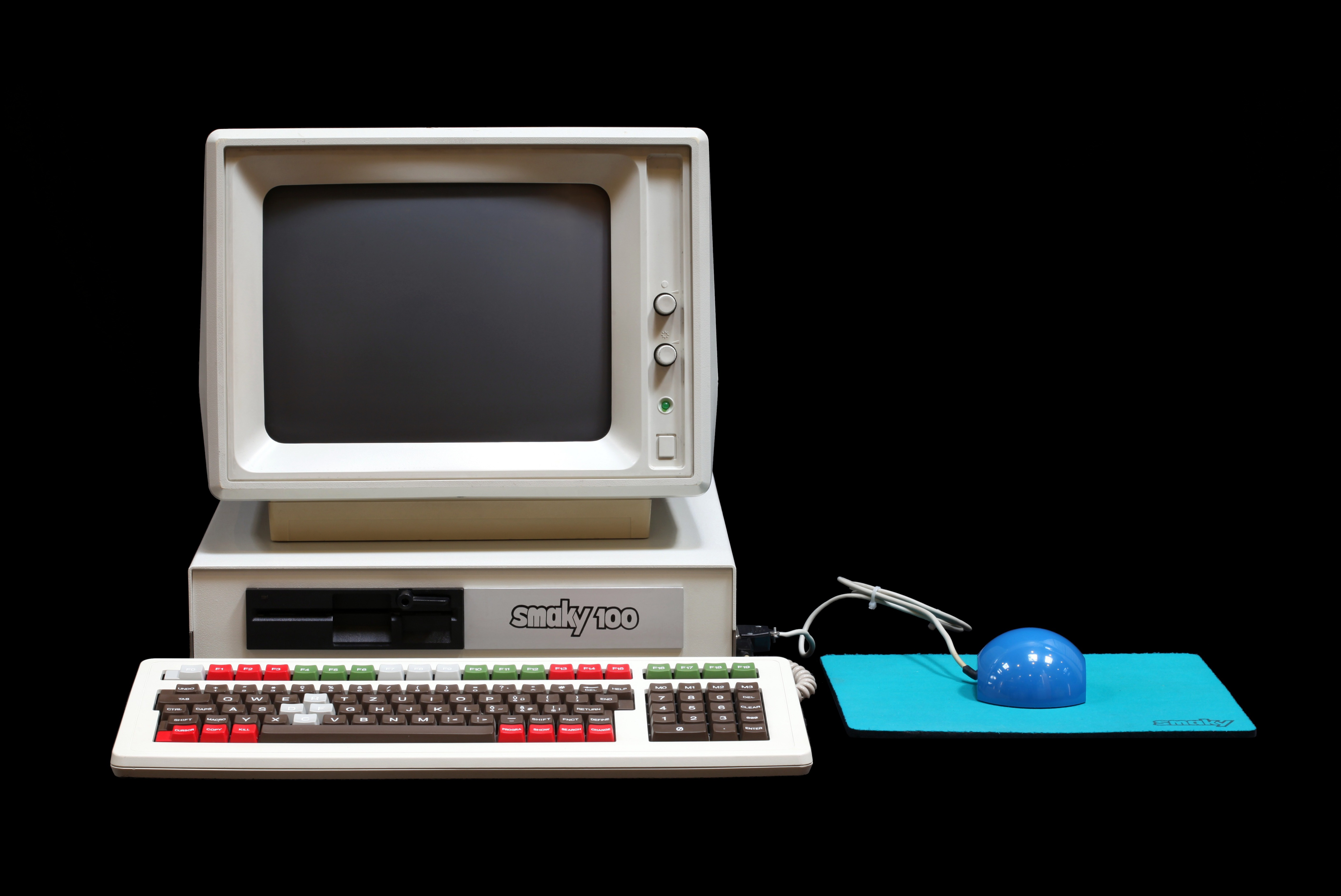
The Smaky 100

The Smaky is a line of mostly 8-bit personal computers and accompanying operating system developed by Professor Jean-Daniel Nicoud and others at the École Polytechnique Fédérale de Lausanne (EPFL) in Switzerland beginning in 1974. The computers were used at École Polytechnique Fédérale de Lausanne and in Swiss schools. The names derives from SMArt KeYboard, reflecting the form factor that contained a compact motherboard which fit within the same housing as the keyboard.

== History ==
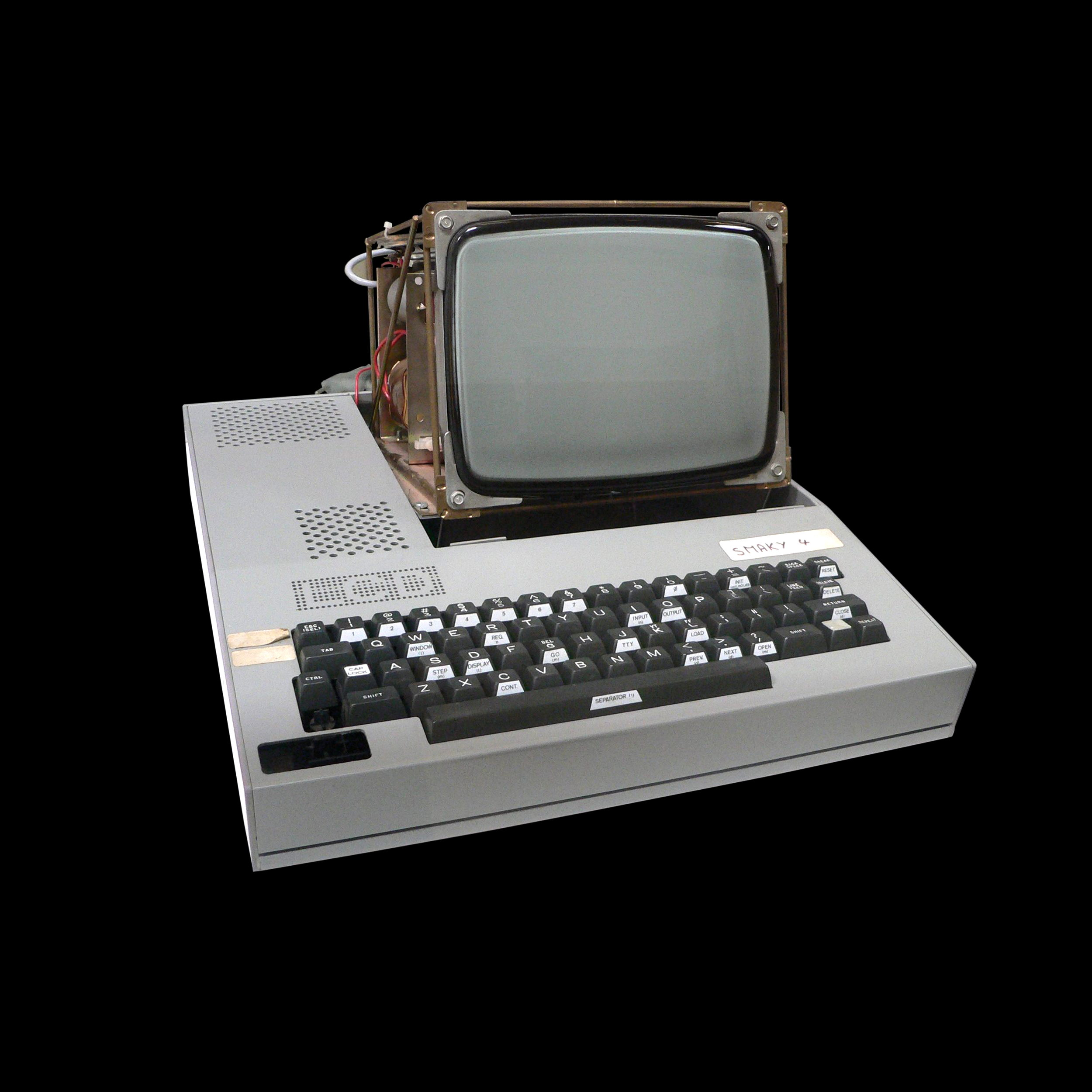
Smaky 4 (prototype)

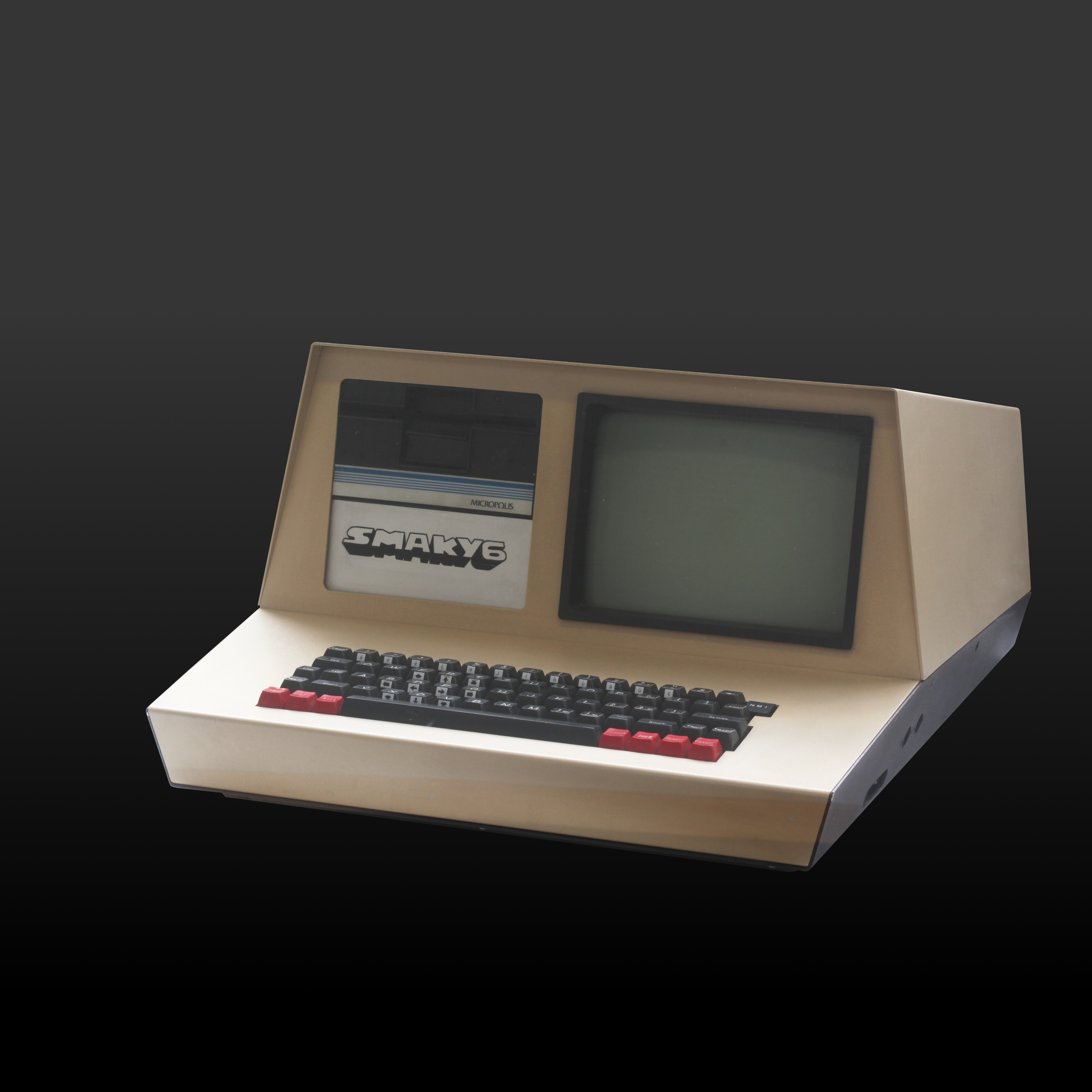
Smaky 6

The first three models, Smaky 1, Smaky 2, and Smaky 4, were based on the Intel 8080 microprocessor (Smaky 3 was a prototype that was never completed). In 1978, the Smaky switched to using the 8-bit Zilog Z80 processor. A portable Smaky was made during this period, which resembled Osborne portable computers.

In 1981, the platform again changed to the 32-bit Motorola 68000 processor. A new operating system was written, called Psos, which was developed specifically for the Smaky, and used on all subsequent models.

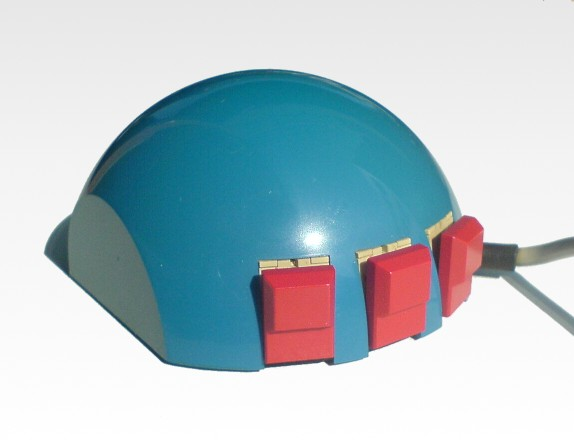
A Smaky mouse, as invented by Jean-Daniel Nicoud and André Guignard

Development work on the Smaky hardware ended with the Smaky 400 in 1997. The Smaky 400 was a PCI board hosting a Motorola 68040 processor, designed to work together with a terminal emulation software running under Windows NT. It helped Smaky users switch from their desktop Smaky to an Intel PC, while preserving access to applications and documents.

== Legacy ==
A Smaky emulator for Microsoft Windows was developed in 1998, replacing the need for the Smaky 400 hardware. It was named the Smaky Infini (French for infinite), since its performance and lifespan were no longer being limited by hardware, it was based on the UAE emulator, merged into the Smaky 400 terminal emulation software.

== See also ==
- Lilith, origin of Smaky's mouse
