= Journal of Evolutionary Biology =

Bimonthly peer-reviewed scientific journal

- Discipline: Evolutionary biology
- Language: English
- Edited by: Max Reuter

Publication details
- History: 1988-present
- Publisher: Oxford University Press on behalf of the European Society for Evolutionary Biology
- Frequency: Bimonthly
- Open access: Delayed, after 2 years
- Impact factor: 2.411 (2020)

Standard abbreviations
- ISO 4: J. Evol. Biol.

Indexing
- CODEN: JEBIEQ
- ISSN: 1010-061X (print); 1420-9101 (web)
- LCCN: 89659590
- OCLC no.: 474043725

Links
- Journal homepage; Online access; Online archive

The Journal of Evolutionary Biology is a peer-reviewed scientific journal published monthly covering the field of evolutionary biology. It is owned by the European Society for Evolutionary Biology. The founding editor-in-chief was Stephen C. Stearns. He was succeeded by Pierre-Henri Gouyon (1992–1995), Rolf Hoekstra (1996–1999), Peter van Tienderen (2000–2003), Juha Merilä (2004–2007), Allen Moore (2007–2010), Michael G. Ritchie (2011-2017), and Wolf U. Blanckenhorn (2017-2021). The current editor is Max Reuter (University College London).
