= Charles Kurland =

American-born Swedish biochemist

- Born: Charles Gabriel Kurland; 14 January 1936 (age 90)
- Citizenship: American and Swedish
- Education: Harvard
- Known for: Biochemistry and biophysics of the ribosome
- Scientific career
- Fields: Biochemistry
- Workplaces: Copenhagen University, Uppsala University, Lund University
- Doctoral advisor: James D. Watson

Charles Gabriel Kurland (born 14 January 1936) is an American-born Swedish biochemist.

Kurland earned a doctorate in 1961 at Harvard University, advised by James D. Watson. Kurland accepted a postdoctoral research position at the Microbiology Institute of the University of Copenhagen, then joined the Uppsala University faculty in 1971. He retired from Uppsala in 2001 and was granted emeritus status. He was later affiliated with Lund University.

== Research ==
Kurland's doctoral work dealt the structure of RNA, and continued with the discovery of messenger RNA (mRNA), work that also involved François Gros, Walter Gilbert and James Watson. This was published simultaneously with the report by Sydney Brenner, François Jacob, and Matthew Meselson of the same discovery. It was followed by numerous papers concerned with ribosomal proteins.

In the later part of his career, Kurland has been interested in the origins of mitochondria and the tree of life.

== Academy memberships ==
Kurland was elected to the Royal Swedish Academy of Sciences in 1988 as a foreign member and reclassified as a Swedish member in 2002. The Estonian Academy of Sciences recognized his achievements in biochemistry and awarded Kurland an equivalent honor in 1991.
