= Nick Barton =

British evolutionary biologist

Nicholas Barton FRS FRSE
- Born: Nicholas Hamilton Barton; 30 August 1955 (age 71)
- Citizenship: British
- Education: Peterhouse, Cambridge (BA); University of East Anglia (PhD)
- Known for: Evolution textbook
- Awards: Bicentenary Medal of the Linnean Society (1985); FRS (1994); Darwin Medal (2006); Darwin–Wallace Medal (2008); Erwin Schrödinger Prize (2013)
- Scientific career
- Fields: Evolutionary biology
- Workplaces: University College London; University of Edinburgh; Institute of Science and Technology Austria
- Thesis: A narrow hybrid zone in the alpine grasshopper podisma pedestris (1979)
- Doctoral advisor: Godfrey Hewitt

Nicholas Hamilton Barton FRS FRSE (born 30 August 1955) is a British evolutionary biologist.

== Education ==
Barton was educated at Peterhouse, Cambridge where he graduated with a first-class degree in biological sciences in 1976 and gained his PhD supervised by Godfrey Hewitt at the University of East Anglia in 1979.

== Career ==
After a brief spell as a lab demonstrator at the University of Cambridge, Barton became a Lecturer at the Department of Genetics and Biometry, University College London, in 1982. Professor Barton is best known for his work on hybrid zones, often using the toad Bombina bombina as a study organism, and for extending the mathematical machinery needed to investigate multilocus genetics, a field in which he worked in collaboration with Michael Turelli. Research questions he has investigated include: the role of epistasis, the evolution of sex, speciation, and the limits on the rate of adaptation.

Barton moved to the University of Edinburgh in 1990, where he is said to have been instrumental in attracting to Edinburgh Brian and Deborah Charlesworth, with whom he had previously collaborated, thus complementing the university's strong tradition in quantitative genetics and population genetics and helping the University of Edinburgh to continue as one of the most important research institutions in evolutionary genetics worldwide. Barton was made a professor in 1994. In 2008 Barton moved to Klosterneuburg (Austria) where he became the first professor at the Institute of Science and Technology Austria.

In 2007, Barton, along with Derek E.G. Briggs, Jonathan A. Eisen, David B. Goldstein, and Nipam H. Patel, collaborated to create Evolution, an undergraduate textbook which integrates molecular biology, genomics, and human genetics with traditional evolutionary studies.

== Awards and honours ==
- 2024 Elected International Member of the National Academy of Sciences
- 2013 Erwin Schrödinger Prize
- 2013 Mendel Medal, Leopoldina
- 2009 Darwin–Wallace Medal
- 2006 Darwin Medal
- 1998 President's Award (joint with Mark Kirkpatrick), American Society of Naturalists
- 1995 Fellow of the Royal Society of Edinburgh
- 1994 Fellow of the Royal Society
- 1994 David Starr Jordan Prize (joint with S. Pacala)
- 1992 Scientific Medal, Zoological Society
- 1985 Bicentenary Medal of the Linnean Society
