= Herdling =

- Developer: Okomotive
- Publisher: Panic
- Directors: Don Schmocker; Goran Saric; Isabelle Roesch
- Designers: Fabio Baumgartner; Philipp Stern; Denise Meier
- Programmer: Lorenz Kleiser
- Composer: Joel Schoch
- Engine: Unity
- Platforms: Windows; Nintendo Switch; PlayStation 5; Xbox Series X/S; Nintendo Switch 2
- Release: Windows, Switch, PS5, Xbox Series X/S; August 21, 2025; Switch 2; November 12, 2026
- Genres: Adventure, puzzle
- Mode: Single player

Herdling is a 2025 puzzle adventure video game developed by Okomotive and published by Panic for Microsoft Windows, Nintendo Switch, PlayStation 5, and Xbox Series X/S and Nintendo Switch 2. It follows Via, a young girl living in a grimy city, as she herds furry and feathery creatures known as calicorns. Once outside the city, the journey starts in a mountainous landscape with several wounded calicorns along the path that can be rescued. The path features forests, plateaus, and valleys, as well as environmental hazards and predators, requiring the player to use stealth to avoid them, as the game provides no tools for combat. By successfully herding the calicorns, the game ends at the creatures' natural habitat on the mountain summit. The game features no dialogue or traditional storyline, focusing on exploration as the player guides the herd to its final destination.

Herdling is the studio's largest project to date and its first three-dimensional game. Panic had partnered with Okomotive since August 2022. The music is composed by Joel Schoch. It received generally positive reviews with a praise for its visuals, music, and emotional connection with the calicorns, though some faulted the lack of storyline, short playtime, and the Switch version's controls. Herdling won the SGDA Swiss Game Award in 2025 for Best Entertainment Game and received nominations in the Golden Joystick Awards, Deutscher Entwicklerpreis, Indie Game Awards, Unity Awards, and D.I.C.E. Awards.

== Gameplay ==
Via, holding a magic stick, takes the calicorns to the snow-laden mountains.

Herdling is a single-player puzzle adventure video game played from a third-person perspective. The player controls Via, who controls a herd of calicorns with a small magical stick. The herd's movement is inversely tied to the player's: when Via moves left, the herd moves right, and vice versa. The herd generally leads the way. It can also be commanded to speed up, slow down, or stop through specific button inputs. Waving the stick changes the herd's trajectory, holding a button slows the herd, rapidly pressing the same button speeds it up, and double-tapping another button stops it. Each calicorn can be named individually, and interacted with by removing twigs and branches from their coats, playing fetch, and adorning them with harnesses and baubles. Stealth is essential for avoiding predators such as the "winged terror" and the "murder owl". Players can enable a "calicorn immortality" option in the settings to prevent deaths.

In certain situations, the calicorns assist the player by providing boosts to cross ledges or by breaking open gates. The calicorns vary in shape and size and react to three colored flowers emitted from the magic stick. Blue flowers fill a gauge for stampedes used for traversing slippery terrain. Red flowers initiate or extend stampedes. Yellow flowers pollinate the calicorns' coat with an energy that reveals memories of the relationship between ancient calicorns and shepherds. Progress is saved by resting at campfires, which are typically found near shrines and also serve as spots to bond with the herd; ways of bonding include playing fetch using baubles and adorning them small trinkets, all which are found near campfires. After a calicorn's death, it may appears as a ghost at campfires or during stampedes. The game includes a built-in photo mode with simple controls for capturing screenshots of the scenery and gameplay.

== Plot ==
Set in a grimy city, Via, a young girl sleeping on a rough mattress in an underpass, wakes to the sound of a blaring car alarm. Investigating the noise, she finds an abandoned parking lot where a large furry and feathered beast has its face stuck in a trash can. Using a wooden stick, she frees the animal, a calicorn, and befriends it. She rescues other calicorns from similar dangers around the city. Together, they leave the city and embark on an adventurous journey in a mountainous landscape with foggy forests, snowy plateaus and hidden valleys.

While herding them, Via learns that the calicorns respond well to jewelry and affection. She guides the herd using a magical stick to control their direction and speed. Along the way, more wounded calicorns are found, healed, and added to the group. Via protects the herd from falling off cliffs and from predators. At the end of the journey, she leads the animals to their natural habitat at the top of the mountains.

== Development and release ==
Following the success of Far: Lone Sails (2018) and Far: Changing Tides (2022), Okomotive sought to create a new intellectual property centered on a story about herding unusual creatures on a journey through mountains. Herdling is the studio's largest project and its first fully three-dimensional game. The studio partnered with publisher Panic in December 2022. Panic had previously published titles such as Firewatch (2016) and Untitled Goose Game (2019). The project was led by Okomotive founders Don Schmocker and Goran Saric, with game design led by Fabio Baumgartner, programming by Lorenz Kleiser, animation by Martina Hugentobler, and music composed by Joel Schoch. Baumgartner, in a pitch with Game Developers Conference 2025, stated his team was "inspired by the Alps and other mountain regions, along with classic atmospheric indie titles". Okomotive's development team consisted of 12 employees.

A trailer was released on the digital distribution service Steam, followed by a demo in the second week of June 2025. The Nintendo Switch version's release date was revealed during Nintendo's Indie World showcase. The game was released on August 21, 2025, on Microsoft Windows, Nintendo Switch, PlayStation 5, and Xbox Series X/S. It was available on Xbox Game Pass and PC Game Pass from day one.

== Reception ==
=== Critical reception ===
Reception

Aggregate score
Aggregator	Score
Metacritic	(PC) 77/100 (PS5) 74/100 (Switch) 69/100 (XSX) 79/100

Review scores
Publication	Score
Eurogamer	4/5
Gamekult	6/10
GameSpot	9/10
Nintendo World Report	7/10
PC Gamer (UK)	84/100
TechRadar	4/5

Herdling received "generally favorable" reviews according to the review aggregator Metacritic.

Softpedia's Cosmin Vasile awarded the game a "very good" rating, praising the guiding mechanics, creature connections, and moments of beauty while criticizing the limited world-building, repetitive herd management, and occasional graphical glitches. Eurogamer's Jim Trinca called the story "powerful and memorable", deeming it successfully told with "interaction, movement and art" despite the lack of dialogue. Rock Paper Shotgun's Edwin Evans-Thirlwell found it somewhat underwhelming compared to Okomotive's Far duology, describing it as less sophisticated and "more straightforwardly utopian" in its tale of an impoverished child and companion creatures escaping modernity, though he considered it "engrossing" as a study between human and animal relations.

Polygon praised the "undeniably gorgeous" graphical quality and art design, singling out the specks of light and distant snowy mountain caps. PC Gamer's Andy Chalk called it "short, sweet and utterly charming", noting that its "evocative beauty" compensated for its simplistic gameplay. Aftermath's Riley MacLeod highlighted the herd's physicality and described the game as a "lovely, relaxed affair with a responsive soundtrack and beautiful vistas". Shacknews's Larrynn Bell wrote that, despite its short length, the game effectively captured the bond between a herder and their animals, and added that artificially increasing the game length would have not improved the game. The A. V. Club's Wallace Truesdale, initially anxious about the nature of the NPCs, was satisfied when the game showed that "each new addition to the herd—a herd that you can thankfully navigate manually at a moment's notice—actually made me feel more free and empowered". The Guardian's Keza MacDonald compared it to The Last Guardian (2016), noting the relative challenge of wrangling creatures of various sizes. Jay Peters of The Verge drew a comparison to Journey (2012) regarding the locations, tone, and playtime. The New York Times's Christopher Byrd appreciated the game's art design and calicorn characterization, describing the title as an art game for its "poetic feel for spatial environments and celebration of life-affirming connections". The gameplay was positively received by Chris Allnutt of Financial Times, who attributed its natural feel to the lack of interface and instruction.

GameSpot's Mark Delaney noted the game's personification of the calicorns, naming and grooming mechanics, puzzles, music, and wordless storytelling, while criticizing the unclear petting and grooming prompts. Nintendo World Report's John Rairdin praised the soundtrack, visuals, performance on the Switch 2, and mechanics, but faulted the vague goals and poor storytelling. TechRadar's Josephine Watson noted the "gorgeous" presentation and decent replayability, but mentioned minor performance issues and the short length. Gamereactor's Ben Lyons appreciated the game's easy mechanics, storyline and visuals while at the same time critiquing the janky controls on Switch such as irregular camera movement and the herd not keeping up with the player. The camera issue on Switch was also noticed by Siliconera's Jenni Lada besides the game looking less sharper as compared to other platforms on which it was released. Windows Central's Zachary Boddy completed the game in five hours and was satisfied with the ending. The French video game website, Gamekult, found the game's conventional calm and wondrous atmosphere to be boring and remarked that more dangerous situations would have given a better gameplay.

The soundtrack by Joel Schoch was acclaimed and nominated for several awards. In a featured article on Video Games Chronicle, composer Joel Bille stated that "[Herdling's] music evokes a vivid sense of beauty, of thriving in the great outdoors, and at the same time carrying a bittersweet melancholic tone".

=== Accolades ===
Awards	Date	Category	Result	Ref.
Deutscher Entwicklerpreis	3 November 2025	Best Audio Design	Nominated	
Deutscher Entwicklerpreis	3 November 2025	Best Game Design	Nominated	
Deutscher Entwicklerpreis	3 November 2025	Best Indie Game	Nominated	
D.I.C.E. Awards	12 February 2026	Outstanding Achievement in Original Music Composition	Nominated	
Golden Joystick Awards	20 November 2025	Best Indie Game	Nominated	
Indie Game Awards	19 December 2025	Best Music	Nominated	
Swiss Game Awards	18 December 2025	Best Entertainment Game	Won	
Unity Awards	9 December 2025	Best 3D Visual	Nominated	
