= Godfrey Hewitt =

British geneticist (1940–2013)

Godfrey M Hewitt
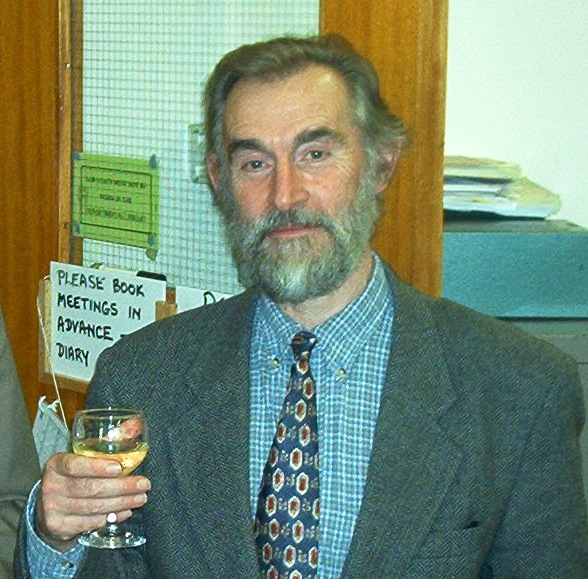
- Professor Godfrey Hewitt (2001)
- Born: 10 January 1940; Worcester, England, U.K
- Died: 18 February 2013 (aged 73); Cambridge, England, U.K
- Citizenship: British
- Education: University of Birmingham; University of California, Davis
- Known for: Influential work in evolutionary genetics, training and acting as a mentor to many academics
- Awards: Darwin–Wallace Medal (2013)
- Scientific career
- Fields: Genetics, Evolutionary Biology, Phylogeography, Hybridization, Speciation
- Workplaces: University of East Anglia
- Doctoral advisor: Kenneth Mather, John Jinks, and Bernard John
- Doctoral students: Nick Barton; Richard Nichols; Michael Ritchie
- Website: http://www.uea.ac.uk/biological-sciences/news/professor-godfrey-hewitt

Godfrey Matthew Hewitt (10 January 1940 – 18 February 2013) was a British professor and evolutionary geneticist at the University of East Anglia who was very influential in the development of the fields of molecular ecology, phylogeography, speciation and hybridisation.

== Academic career ==
Hewitt was born in Worcester UK in 1940 and attended The King's School there. He took his undergraduate degree at the University of Birmingham and stayed to complete a PhD with advisors Kenneth Mather, John Jinks, and Bernard John. He subsequently gained a Fulbright Fellowship to study at the University of California, Davis in 1965–1966. On his return he took up a position at the newly established University of East Anglia, and he was promoted to Professor in 1988. He worked in the School of Biological Sciences until his retirement in 2005, and subsequently maintained a very substantial scientific output as Emeritus Professor.

== Publications ==
At the time of his death Hewitt had 250 peer reviewed academic publications and these had been cited by approximately ten thousand other articles according to Web of Knowledge. His most highly cited publications are in the area of phylogeography and hybrid zones. In particular Hewitt was influential in understanding the diversity of European biota in the context of glacial cycles.

== Awards and achievements ==
Hewitt served as president of the European Society for Evolutionary Biology from 1999 to 2001. He was awarded the 2005 Molecular Ecology Prize, and he received a Lifetime Achievement Award for creative mentoring in science (2006) from Nature magazine. This achievement is reflected in the large number of students and postdocs who have established their own academic careers.

Hewitt had strong links with many international organisations; he was awarded Doctor "Honoris Causa" by the Universidad Autonoma de Madrid in 2008; appointed as honorary professor at the Institute of Zoology, Chinese Academy of Sciences, Beijing in 2000; was a visiting professor at La Sapienza, University of Rome 1 (1998); Royal Society Visiting Fellow, University of Hawaii (1979); visiting fellow at the Australian National University, Canberra (1973–1974); Royal Society Visiting Fellow at the Gulbenkian Institute, Portugal (1971).
