= Allen J. Moore =

American geneticist (born 1958)

- Born: Allen Jonathan Moore; January 27, 1958 (age 68); Jackson, Michigan, US
- Education: Arizona State University; University of Colorado, Boulder
- Awards: T. P. Cooper Outstanding Research Award from the University of Kentucky (1996)
- Scientific career
- Fields: Genetics
- Institutions: University of Kentucky; University of Manchester; University of Exeter; University of Georgia
- Thesis: Female mate choice in a cockroach, Nauphoeta cinerea, and tests of genetic models of sexual selection (1988)
- Doctoral advisor: Michael D. Breed

Allen Jonathan Moore (born January 27, 1958) is a distinguished research professor in the Department of Entomology at the University of Georgia. From May 2017 to June 2022 he served as associate dean for research in the College of Agricultural and Environmental Sciences. Prior to that role, he served as head of the university's department of genetics in the Franklin College of Arts and Sciences. He served as editor-in-chief of the Journal of Evolutionary Biology from 2007 to 2011, and he has been editor-in-chief of the open access journal Ecology and Evolution since 2011. In 2012, he was named a fellow of the American Association for the Advancement of Science.
