= European Society for Evolutionary Biology =

Organisation to support the study of organic evolution

The European Society for Evolutionary Biology (ESEB) was founded on 28 August 1987 in Basel, Switzerland, with ~ 450 evolutionary biologists attending the inaugural congress of the Society; Arthur Cain became the Society’s first president. The founding of the ESEB was closely linked to the launching of the Society’s journal, the Journal of Evolutionary Biology, with Stephen C. Stearns as the first Editor in Chief, and the first issue appearing in January 1988. See the editorial opening of the journal; see also Steve Stearns’ account of the early days of the ESEB.

ESEB aims at supporting the study of organic evolution. Beside publishing the Journal of Evolutionary Biology and co-publishing Evolution Letters, the society organizes a biannual congress and supports other events to promote advances in evolutionary biology. ESEB also supports activities to promote a scientific view of organic evolution in research and education.

Since its foundation, the ESEB has grown and matured, with around 1500 members, while the Journal of Evolutionary Biology became a major journal in the field. This reflects the growth of the evolutionary biology community in Europe and beyond, which the Society helped to foster.

ESEB supports young researchers through sponsoring the annual EMPSEB (European Meeting of PhD Students in Evolutionary Biology).

== Presidents ==
Source: ESEB

- 1987–1989: Arthur Cain (first president)
- 1989–1991: Bengt Bengtsson
- 1991–1993: John Maynard Smith
- 1993–1995: John L. Harper
- 1995–1997: Wim Scharloo
- 1997–1999: Stephen C. Stearns
- 1999–2001: Godfrey Hewitt
- 2001–2003: Deborah Charlesworth
- 2003–2005: Rolf Hoekstra
- 2005–2007: Paul Brakefield
- 2007–2009: Isabelle Olivieri
- 2009–2011: Siv Andersson
- 2011–2013: Brian Charlesworth
- 2013–2015: Roger Butlin
- 2015–2017: Laurent Keller
- 2017–2019: Nina Wedell
- 2019–2021: Ophélie Ronce
- 2021–2023: Astrid Groot

== Objectives and activities ==
ESEB aims to support and promote the study of organic evolution and the integration of scientific fields concerned with evolution, including molecular and microbial evolution, behavior, genetics, ecology, life histories, development, paleontology, systematics, and morphology. The society organizes various activities such as workshops, conferences, and symposia to foster collaboration and dissemination of research in evolutionary biology.

== Awards and grants ==
ESEB offers several awards and grants to support the scientific community, particularly young researchers. These include travel grants for attending conferences, mobility grants for Ph.D. students and postdoctoral fellows, and awards for outstanding contributions to evolutionary biology. The society's commitment to supporting early-career scientists is evident in its sponsorship of the annual European Meeting of PhD Students in Evolutionary Biology (EMPSEB).

== Publications ==
The society's flagship journal, the Journal of Evolutionary Biology, publishes high-quality research articles on all aspects of evolutionary biology. ESEB also co-publishes Evolution Letters, a journal focusing on rapid dissemination of significant new research in evolutionary biology. Both journals aim to provide a platform for the latest discoveries and theoretical developments in the field.

== Conferences ==
ESEB organizes a biannual congress, which serves as a major platform for evolutionary biologists to present their research, network, and discuss new developments in the field. These congresses are held in different European cities and feature a range of symposia, plenary talks, and poster sessions. The congresses are attended by scientists from around the world and are an important venue for fostering international collaboration.

== Educational initiatives ==
ESEB is committed to promoting education in evolutionary biology. The society provides financial, organisational and strategic support to foster the growth of local evolutionary biology communities in various parts of the world, supports outreach programs, and the development of educational materials to enhance the teaching of evolutionary biology at all levels.
