= Ethnic bioweapon =

Weapon that harms people having certain genes

An ethnic bioweapon (or a biogenetic weapon) is a hypothetical type of bioweapon which could preferentially target people of specific ethnicities or people with specific genotypes.

== History ==
One of the first modern fictional discussions of ethnic weapons is in Robert A. Heinlein's 1942 novel Sixth Column (republished as The Day After Tomorrow), in which a race-specific radiation weapon is used against a so-called "Pan-Asian" invader.

=== Genetic weapons ===
In 1997, U.S. Secretary of Defense William Cohen referred to the concept of an ethnic bioweapon as a possible risk. In 1998, some biological weapon experts considered such a "genetic weapon" plausible, and believed the former Soviet Union had undertaken some research on the influence of various substances on human genes.

In its 2000 policy paper Rebuilding America's Defenses, think-tank Project for the New American Century (PNAC) described ethnic bioweapons as a "politically useful tool" that US adversaries could have incentives to develop and use.

The possibility of a "genetic bomb" is presented in Vincent Sarich's and Frank Miele's book Race: The Reality of Human Differences, published in 2004. These authors view such weapons as technically feasible but unlikely to be used. (page 248 of paperback edition.)

In 2004, The Guardian reported that the British Medical Association (BMA) considered bioweapons designed to target certain ethnic groups as a possibility, and highlighted problems that advances in science for such things as "treatment to Alzheimer's and other debilitating diseases could also be used for malign purposes".

In 2005, the official view of the International Committee of the Red Cross was "The potential to target a particular ethnic group with a biological agent is probably not far off. These scenarios are not the product of the ICRC's imagination but have either occurred or been identified by countless independent and governmental experts."

In May 2007, it was reported that the Russian government banned all exports of human biosamples. The reason for the ban was allegedly a report by the head of FSB Nikolay Patrushev presented to Vladimir Putin. The report claimed about on-going development of "genetic bioweapons" targeting Russian population by Western institutions.

In 2008, the US government held a congressional committee, ‘Genetics and other human modification technologies: sensible international regulation or a new kind of arms race?’, during which it was discussed how “we can anticipate a world where rogue (and even not-so-rogue) states and non-state actors attempt to manipulate human genetics in ways that will horrify us”.

In 2012, The Atlantic wrote that a specific virus that targets individuals with a specific DNA sequence is within possibility in the near future. The magazine put forward a hypothetical scenario of a virus which caused mild flu to the general population but deadly symptoms to the President of the United States. They cite advances in personalized gene therapy as evidence.

In 2016, Foreign Policy magazine suggested the possibility of a virus used as an ethnic bioweapon that could sterilize a "genetically-related ethnic population."

== People's Republic of China ==
In 2017, a textbook published by the People's Liberation Army National Defence University called the Science of Military Strategy debuted the potential for biological warfare to include "specific ethnic genetic attacks." The same year, former People's Liberation Army general Zhang Shibo authored a book that concluded that "modern biotechnology development is gradually showing strong signs characteristic of an offensive capability," including "specific ethnic genetic attacks" (Chinese: 特定种族基因攻击). In 2020, a professor at the same PLA university spoke of the "huge war effectiveness" of a "targeted attack that destroys a race, or a specific group of people." A 2021 study by the James Martin Center for Nonproliferation Studies stated that the Chinese government's interest in biological weapons is driven by a recognition of its own vulnerability to genetic targeting due to a broadly homogenous population with more than 90 percent being ethnic Han Chinese. In October 2023, the Ministry of State Security publicly warned about the possibility of "genetic weapons...developed to kill targets of a predetermined race."

== Israeli "ethno-bomb" controversy ==
In November 1998, The Sunday Times reported that Israel was attempting to build an "ethno-bomb" containing a biological agent that could specifically target genetic traits present amongst Arab populations. Wired News also reported the story, as did Foreign Report.

Microbiologists and geneticists were skeptical towards the scientific plausibility of such a biological agent. The New York Post, describing the claims as "blood libel", reported that the likely source for the story was a work of science fiction by Israeli academic Doron Stanitsky. Stanitsky had sent his completely fictional work about such a weapon to Israeli newspapers two years before. The article also noted the views of genetic researchers who claimed the idea as "wholly fantastical", with others claiming that the weapon was theoretically possible but struggling to explain how exactly it could be accomplished.

== See also ==
- Biological warfare
- Race and health
- SARS conspiracy theory
- Pharmacogenomics
- Toxicogenomics
