= G3P =

G3P may refer to:

== Chemistry ==
- Glyceraldehyde 3-phosphate, or 3-phosphoglyceraldehyde
- Glycerol 3-phosphate

== Other uses ==
- Global public–private partnership (GPPP)

== See also ==
- 3GP
- 3PG, 3-Phosphoglyceric acid
- GP3 (disambiguation)
- P3G
