= GP3 =

GP3 may refer to:

- GP3 Series, an open-wheeler motor racing series launched in 2010
- Grand Prix 3, a racing simulator game
- .gp3, format used by Guitar Pro
- 1999 GP3 or (17055) 1999 GP3, a minor planet

== See also ==
- Moto3, motorcycle GP class 3
- GPPP, global public–private partnership
- 3GP, a file format
- G3P (disambiguation) (disambiguation)
- GP (disambiguation)
