= Population study =

Study of a group of individuals taken from the general population

Population study is an interdisciplinary field of scientific study that uses various statistical methods and models to analyse, determine, address, and predict population challenges and trends from data collected through various data collection methods such as population census, registration method, sampling, and some other systems of data sources. In the various fields of healthcare, a population study is a study of a group of individuals taken from the general population who share a common characteristic, such as age, sex, or health condition. This group may be studied for different reasons, such as their response to a drug or risk of getting a disease.

== See also ==
- Demography
