= Egyptomania =

Egyptomania may refer to:

- Ancient Egypt in the Western imagination, interest of ancient Egypt in Europe from the Victorian Age on
- Egyptomania in the United States, interest in ancient Egypt specific to the United States
