= Laurence Hurst =

Laurence Hurst FRS FMedSci
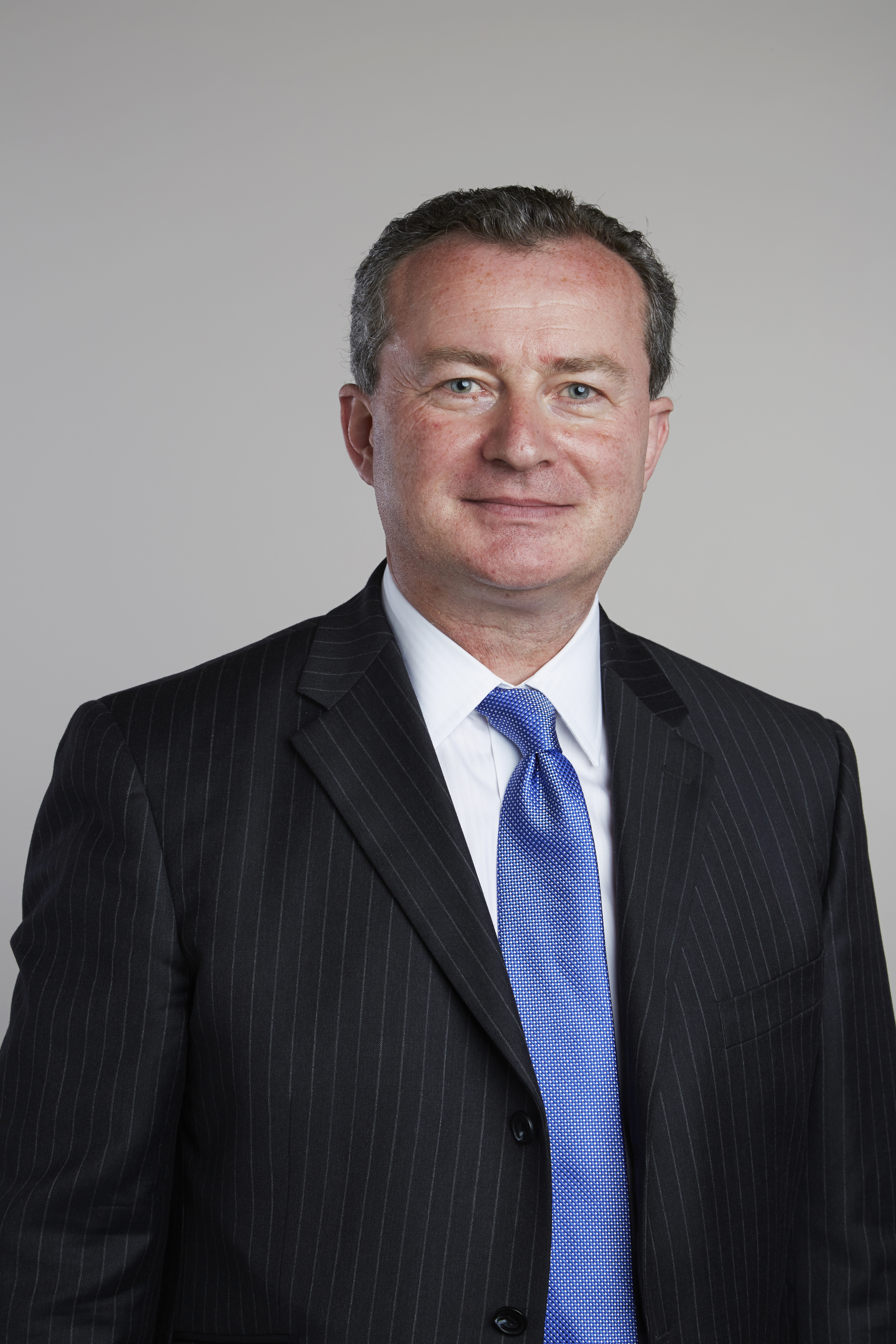
- Hurst in 2015
- Born: Laurence Daniel Hurst; 6 January 1965 (age 61); Ilkley, Yorkshire
- Education: Truro School
- Alma mater: University of Cambridge (BA); University of Oxford (DPhil)
- Scientific career
- Fields: Genetics; Evolution
- Institutions: University of Bath; University of Oxford; University of Cambridge; Harvard University
- Thesis: Intra-genomic conflict and evolution (1991)
- Doctoral advisor: W. D. Hamilton; Alan Grafen
- Doctoral students: Gilean McVean
- Website: go.bath.ac.uk/ldhurst

Laurence Daniel Hurst (born 6 January 1965) is a Professor of Evolutionary Genetics in the Department of Biology and Biochemistry at the University of Bath and the director of the Milner Centre for Evolution until April, 2024.

== Education ==
Hurst was educated at Truro School and the University of Cambridge where he studied the Natural Sciences Tripos at Churchill College, Cambridge, graduating with a Bachelor of Arts degree in 1987. After a year at Harvard University he returned to the UK, and was awarded a Doctor of Philosophy (DPhil) degree from the University of Oxford in 1991 for research supervised by W. D. Hamilton and Alan Grafen.

== Career and Research ==
Hurst was a Royal Society University Research Fellow at the University of Cambridge from 1993 to 1996 and has been a professor at the University of Bath since 1997.

His research interests include evolution, genetics and genomics using computational and mathematical techniques to understand the way genes and genomes evolve. This has resulted in work on housekeeping genes, gene orders, and the evolution of drug resistance in Staphylococcus aureus, Saccharomyces cerevisiae and the evolution of sexual reproduction / sexual dimorphism.

Hurst works on fundamental problems in the evolution of genetic systems, such as understanding why some sorts of mutations are less damaging than predicted whilst others are more damaging. Mutations that change proteins are, surprisingly, often not especially deleterious. Hurst showed that this was because the genetic code is structured in a way that renders it highly error-proof. Similarly, in applying network representations of gene interactions, he revealed why many deletions of genes have little effect and which deletions tend not to be recessive.

By contrast, Hurst revealed that genomic changes often considered to be relatively harmless – such as gene order changes and mutations at 'silent' sites – are under selection for unanticipated reasons. He also showed how synonymous mutations can disrupt the way gene transcripts are processed. Similarly, in showing that genomes are arranged into gene expression domains, Hurst revealed that genes can affect the expression of other genes in their vicinity. As of 2015 translation of this fundamental work to medicine is a focus of his research.

In 2025, Hurst published The Evolution of Imperfection, in which he discusses the genomic reasons why evolution produces suboptimal rather than perfect organisms.

=== Awards and honours ===
Hurst was elected a Fellow of the Academy of Medical Sciences (FMedSci) and a Fellow of the Royal Society (FRS) in 2015. His certificate of election to the Royal Society reads:

Hurst is a leading authority on evolution of genetic systems. He showed that the genetic code is adapted to minimise errors, synonymous mutations in mammals are under selection and gene order is non-random. He was first to recognise the impact of gene expression levels on protein evolution. Hurst spearheaded novel approaches to evolutionary genetics deriving fitness from underlying biochemistry to predict the outcome of laboratory models. This led to fundamental insights into causes of gene dispensability, dominance and variation in gene family size. Hurst, collaborating with cell biologists, identified the human-specific pluripotency gene network and discovered human naïve stem cells.

Hurst was awarded the Scientific Medal of the Zoological Society of London in 2003, and elected a member of European Molecular Biology Organization (EMBO) in 2004. He was awarded The Genetics Society Medal in 2010.
