= CARTaGENE biobank =

CARTaGENE is a population-based cohort based on an ongoing and long-term health study of 40,000 men and women in Québec. It is a regional cohort member of the Canadian Partnership for Tomorrow's Health (CanPath). The project's core mandate is to identify the genetic and environmental causes of common chronic diseases affecting the Québecois population, and to develop personalized medicine and public policy initiatives targeting high-risk groups for the public.

CARTaGENE is under the scientific direction of Professor Guillaume Lettre and Associate Professor Vikki Ho. Based in Montréal, Québec, Canada. It is operated under the infrastructure of the Sainte-Justine Children's Hospital University Health Center and has seen funding from Genome Canada, the Canadian Foundation for Innovation, Génome Québec and the Canadian Partnership Against Cancer (CPAC) since 2007, among other sources. The program was initially founded by Professors Claude Laberge and Bartha Knoppers, and developed through two phases of participant recruitment under the direction of Professor Philip Awadalla as Scientific Director of the cohort from 2009 to 2015, who is now the National Scientific Director of the Canadian Partnership for Tomorrow's Health (CanPath). Sébastien Jacquemont was responsible for genotyping all CARTaGENE participants.

== Design ==
The CARTaGENE cohort was set up to recruit men and women aged 40–69 years old from Québec representing an age range most at risk for developing chronic diseases, including cardiovascular disease, metabolic disorders like diabetes mellitus and cancer, among others.

Taking place between August 2009 and October 2010, 20,007 participants were enrolled in its first phase of recruitment (Phase A) and between December 2012 and February 2015, a new wave of recruitment (Phase B) has enrolled an additional 20,000 participants. The participants were randomly selected and tracked based on their files in the governmental health administrative databases (RAMQ-Régie de l'Assurance Maladie du Québec). Participants were also selected to be representative of 1% of the metropolitan areas of Québec, specifically Montreal, Québec City, Sherbrooke and the Saguenay. Because of administrative linkage between the RAMQ and the CHU Sainte-Justine, participants can be passively followed for the next 50 years. Information packages about the project were first sent by mail and potential participants were contacted by telephone to enroll and schedule visits to one of the clinical assessment sites. CARTaGENE is part of a Canada-wide cohort collecting samples across the country whose methods were applied in the design of the five cohorts within the Canadian Partnership for Tomorrow Project (CPTP).

== Molecular profiling ==
Detailed clinical chemistry and complete blood counts for each of the participants was collected. Detailed lipid profiles, Hba1c, bone density and creatinine were also collected. Blood collection was designed such that DNA and RNA can be extracted for future use, allowing for population level gene expression analysis and genotyping. Storage conditions are also optimized for proteomics and lipidomics. The CARTaGENE project has a Systems Genomics program to identify critical events associated with a number of cardiovascular related endophenotypes. It is developing integrative technologies and approaches to capture single-nucleotide polymorphisms (SNPs) associated with endophenotypes.

=== Typical studies ===
Typical studies include population-based longitudinal studies. Researchers may try to evaluate the contribution of a particular lifestyle, environmental and genetic factors and a chosen endophenotype. The use of endophenotypes facilitates a more realistic dataset on gene-environment interactions influencing particular endophenotypes.

== Development ==
There was an initial pilot study done under the direction of Professor Bartha Knoppers (McGill University) and Professor Claude Laberge (Laval University) that involved 223 participants who responded to a questionnaire based on the P3G DataSHaPER model. The scales used in the questionnaires were developed and revised by more than 30 experts from various fields and are widely used. These included the Patient Health questionnaire, the General Anxiety Scale, the Job Content and International Physical Activity Questionnaire (IPAQ).

Beginning in 2009, under the direction of Professor Philip Awadalla, a total of 12 assessment sites across the province were established for clinical and physical assessments. Following initial phone contact, participants were invited to come to the assessment site and sign a consent form. They were asked to complete a self-administered demographic and lifestyle questionnaire and an interviewer-administered health questionnaire. A genealogical questionnaire was also included for completion online. Non-invasive measurements were taken that included basic measurements such as weight, height, and blood pressure. Blood, saliva and urine were collected and preserved at the Biobanque Génome Québec and the affiliated University Hospital Center in Chicoutimi (Biobanque GQ-CAURC) for future use. Surveys about nutrition are also included and residential information, occupational history and food frequency data questionnaires are administered. Ending in February 2015, a total of over 40,000 participants were recruited to the CARTaGENE program and data is accessible through the Canadian Partnership for Tomorrow Program portal.

== Ethics and governance ==
CARTaGENE complies with local, national, international laws and ethical norms. These include the Canadian Charter of Rights and Freedoms, the Charter of Human Rights and Freedoms, the Civil Code of Québec, the Declaration of Helsinki-World Medical Association (revised in 2008), the Universal Declaration on the Human Genome and Human Rights (1997) and the Universal Declaration on Bioethics and Human Rights: UNESCO (2005), among others. CARTaGENE also complies with recommendations by the "Plan d'action ministériel en éthique de la recherche et en intégrité scientifique" from the MSSS (1998), the "Guide d'élaboration de normes de gestion des banques de données" from the MSSS (2004) and the "Politique de la recherche avec des êtres humains" (2004), among others.

== Legal monitoring ==
CARTaGENE is monitored by the research ethics Board of the Sainte-Justine University Health Center. It is also under the supervision of the Information Access Commission (the CAI). This organization authorizes the transfer of information from the RAMQ to the call center that contacts participants and all personal information held by CARTaGENE is subject to surveillance by the CAI.

== Access ==
Participant medical history is maintained at a centralized governmental database (RAMQ), allowing researchers to track these individuals for the duration of the study and monitor all medical events, prescriptions of drugs and deaths. The personal information connecting medical records to the patient identification undergoes de-identification and is coded by CARTaGENE, but handled and managed by the RAMQ ensuring patient confidentiality.

Researchers can request access to the CARTaGENE data through the Canadian Partnership for Tomorrow Project Portal. Researchers must submit an application and undergo evaluation by an independent Sample and Data Access Committee (SDAC). The dataset is available to researchers in industry and academic institutions. Applications detailing their project proposal are a requirement for review by an independent committee, the Sample and Data Access Committee (SDAC). The scientific management of CARTaGENE along with the SDAC determines if data or results should need to be returned to the project. Submission for access to the dataset is done directly online.

== Recruitment and reassessment ==
Health reassessments will take place regularly, using web-based questionnaires in the coming years. Patients may be tracked for up to 50 years based on their linkage to governmental health administrative databases.

== Harmonization ==
CARTaGENE has been designed such that its infrastructure including the collection of samples, measurements of biological variables and the storage procedures can be harmonized with other international large-scale cohorts via the Public Population Project in Genomics (P3G) platform. A nationwide effort is underway to collect samples from participants across Canada, with CaG representing one of five cohorts within the Canadian Partnership for Tomorrow (CPTP). CPTP has recruited over 300,000 participants to create a databank on Canadian health.

== Opinion and media ==
The public was generally receptive to the creation of the CARTaGENE project and an independent study reported on the consultations held with members of the public. The main concerns raised were about safeguarding medical records and confidentiality, respect for individual transparency, the donor's right to feedback and governance.

=== Print media ===
Local and national media have reported on CARTaGENE.

- La Presse/La Presse Canadienne, Lia Levesque (15 January 2013) « Un ratio «inquiétant» de Québécois ont une maladie chronique à leur insu »
- Le Soleil, Jean François Cliche (15 January 2013) « Projet Cartagène: jusqu'à un Québécois sur deux malade sans le savoir »
- Le Droit/La Presse Canadienne, Lia Levesque (January 2013) « Des Québécois atteints de maladies chroniques sans le savoir »
- La Tribune/La Presse Canadienne, Lia Levesque (14 January 2013) « Des Québécois atteints de maladies chroniques sans le savoir »
- Le Devoir, Pauline Gravel (15 January 2013) « Cartagène commence à porter ses fruits »
- The Gazette, Charlie Fidelman (15 January 2013). Quebec's CARTaGene genetic study shows "huge portion" of population unaware of chronic diseases.
- The Ottawa Citizen, Charlie Fidelman (15 January 2013). Quebec's CARTaGene genetic study shows "huge portion" of population unaware of chronic diseases.
- Le Devoir, Pauline Gravel (18 January 2013) « Données génétiques - La biobanque Cartagène est hautement sécurisée »

=== Television ===
- Radio-Canada TV, Catherine Kovacks (14 January 2013) « Cartagène à la recherche de volontaires »
- CBC News Montreal Late, Nancy Woods (14 January 2013) Montreal Late 12:28
