= JFHS =

JFHS may refer to:

- James Fallon High School, Albury, New South Wales, Australia
- Jefferson Forest High School, Forest, Virginia, United States
- Joondalup Family Health Study
