= Gil McVean =

British statistical geneticist (born 1973)

Gil McVean FRS FMedSci
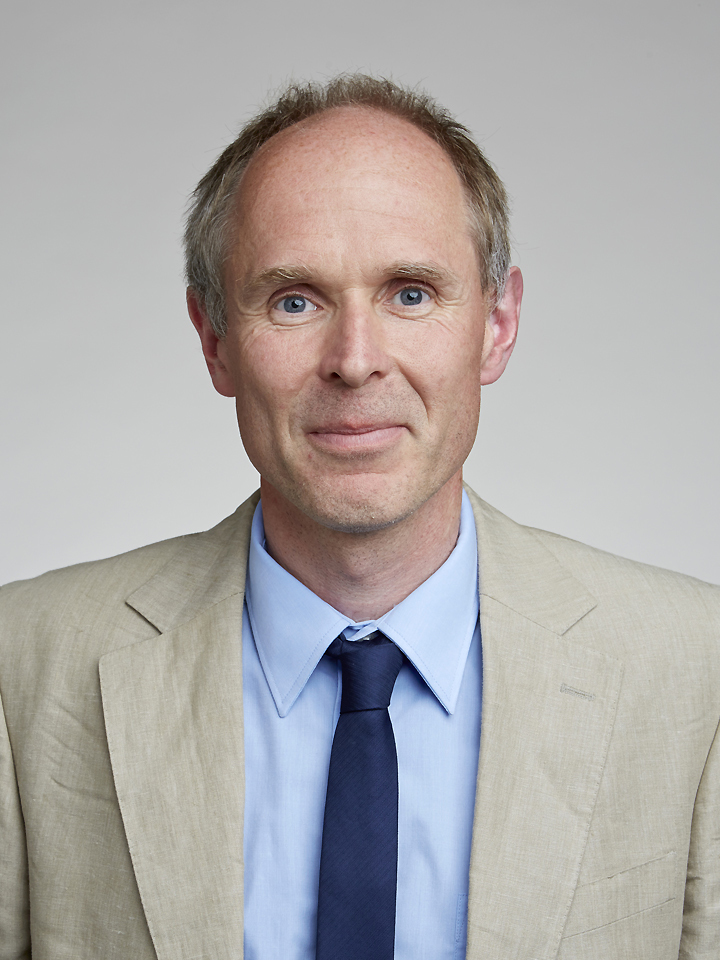
- McVean in 2016
- Born: Gilean Alistair Tristram McVean; February 1973 (age 53)
- Education: University of Oxford (BA); University of Cambridge (PhD)
- Awards: Francis Crick Medal & Lecture (2010); Weldon Memorial Prize (2012); Fellow of the Royal Society (2016); Fellow of the Academy of Medical Sciences (2016)
- Scientific career
- Workplaces: University of Oxford; University of Edinburgh
- Thesis: Adaptation and conflict : the differences between the sexes in mammalian genome evolution (1998)
- Doctoral advisor: Laurence Hurst
- Other academic advisors: Brian Charlesworth; Deborah Charlesworth
- Website: Professor Gil McVean - University of Oxford

Gilean Alistair Tristram McVean (born February 1973) is a professor of statistical genetics at the University of Oxford, fellow of Linacre College, Oxford and co-founder and director of Genomics plc. He also co-chaired the 1000 Genomes Project analysis group.

== Education ==
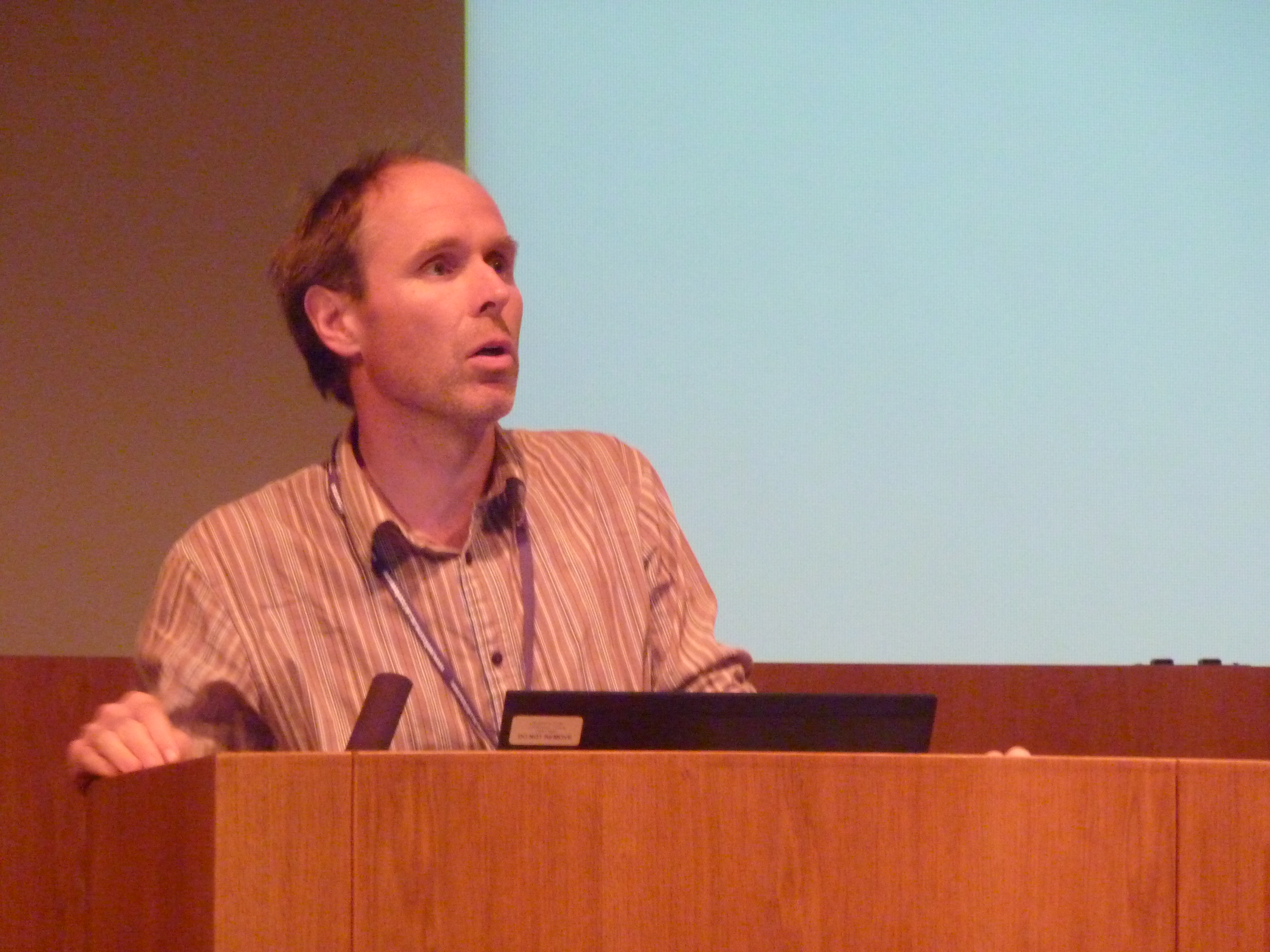
Gilean McVean speaking at the 2010 GEM meeting at the Wellcome Trust Sanger Institute, Hinxton

From 1991 to 1994, he completed a Bachelor of Arts degree in Biological Sciences at the University of Oxford. He completed his PhD in the Department of Genetics at the University of Cambridge supervised by Laurence Hurst in 1998.

== Career and research ==
McVean completed postdoctoral research at the University of Edinburgh from 1997 to 2000, supervised by Brian and Deborah Charlesworth.

From 2000 to 2004, he was a Royal Society University Research Fellow in the Department of Statistics at Oxford, where he has also been a University lecturer in Mathematical Genetics since 2004. He was reappointed in 2009 until retirement age. In October 2006, he was appointed professor of statistical genetics at the University of Oxford.

McVean's research focuses on population genetics, statistics and evolutionary biology including the International HapMap Project, recombination rates in the human genome and the 1000 Genomes Project.

McVean developed a statistical method to look at recombination rate which helped to identify PRDM9 as a hotspot positioning gene. In 2014, with Peter Donnelly, McVean co-founded Genomics plc, a genomics analysis company, as a corporate spin-off of the University of Oxford. In 2017, he was a founding director of the Big Data Institute at the University of Oxford.

=== Honours and awards ===
In 2006 McVean was awarded a Philip Leverhulme Prize.

In 2010, McVean was awarded the Francis Crick Medal and delivered that year's lecture entitled "Our genomes, our history".

In 2012, he was awarded the Weldon Memorial Prize.

In 2013, he presented a talk TEDxWarwick entitled A Thousand Genomes a Thousand Stories.

In May 2014, McVean was elected as a member of the European Molecular Biology Organisation.

McVean was elected Fellow of the Royal Society (FRS) in 2016 and a Fellow of the Academy of Medical Sciences (FMedSci).
