= Brian Charlesworth =

British evolutionary biologist (born 1945)

Brian Charlesworth FRSE, FRS
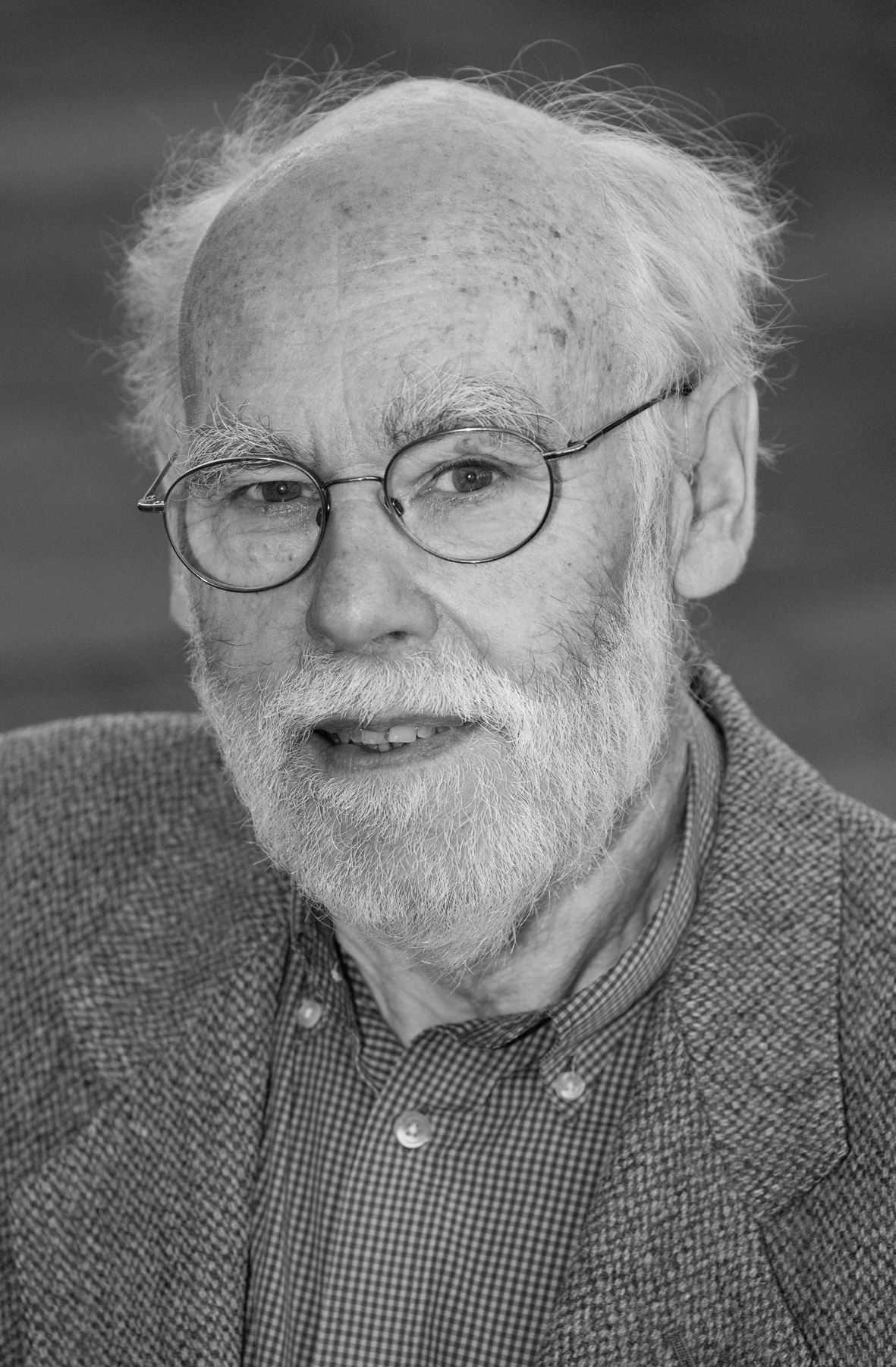
- Born: Brian Charlesworth; 29 April 1945 (age 81)
- Citizenship: British
- Education: University of Cambridge (BA, PhD)
- Spouse: Deborah Maltby (m. 1967)
- Children: 1 daughter
- Awards: Thomas Hunt Morgan Medal (2015); Darwin-Wallace Medal (2010); Sewall Wright Award (2006); Frink Medal (2006)
- Scientific career
- Fields: Evolutionary biology
- Workplaces: University of Edinburgh; University of Chicago; University of Liverpool; University of Sussex
- Thesis: Genetic variation in viability in Drosophila melanogaster (1968)
- Doctoral students: Michael R. Rose
- Other notable students: Gilean McVean (postdoc)

Brian Charlesworth FRS FRSE (born 29 April 1945) is a British evolutionary biologist at the University of Edinburgh, and editor of Biology Letters. Since 1997, he has been Royal Society Research Professor at the Institute of Evolutionary Biology (IEB) in Edinburgh. He has been married since 1967 to the British evolutionary biologist Deborah Charlesworth.

== Education ==
Charlesworth gained a Bachelor of Arts degree in Biological Sciences from Queens' College, Cambridge, followed by a PhD in genetics in 1969 for research into genetic variation in viability in the fruit fly Drosophila melanogaster.

== Career ==
Following his PhD, Charlesworth did postdoctoral research at the University of Chicago, University of Liverpool 1971–1974 and the University of Sussex under John Maynard Smith 1974–82. He returned to Chicago, to be professor of ecology and evolution from 1985 to 1997 after which he moved to Edinburgh.

== Research ==
Charlesworth has worked extensively on understanding sequence evolution, using the fruit fly as a model species, and has also contributed theoretical work on aging, the evolution of recombination and the evolution of sex chromosomes.

In April 2010, the journal Philosophical Transactions of the Royal Society B was dedicated to honour Brian's contribution to the field of population genetics.

== Awards and honours ==
Charlesworth was elected a Fellow of the Royal Society (FRS) in 1991, and won its Darwin Medal in 2000. He won the 2006 Frink Medal, of the Zoological Society of London and in 2010 was awarded the Darwin-Wallace Medal of the Linnean Society. His nomination for the Royal Society reads:

Distinguished for his theoretical and experimental studies of population genetics and evolutionary biology. He extended the theory of selection in age-structured populations which provides the genetical foundation for the study of the evolution of life-history patterns and ageing, and demonstrated experimentally genetic variation in such traits. He made major contributions to the theory of the related topics of selection for the rate of genetic recombination, the evolution of complexes of tightly linked genes and the evolution of separate sexes and outbreeding, and showed experimentally that recombination rates could be changed by selection. He has developed a theory for the population dynamics of transposable genetic elements which provide standard models for the analysis and interpretation of data on transposable element frequencies.

In 2015, the Genetics Society of America awarded Charlesworth its Thomas Hunt Morgan Medal. This award is given to recognize "lifetime achievement in the field of genetics. It recognizes the full body of work of an exceptional geneticist," according to the Thomas Hunt Morgan Medal webpage.
