= Frank Miele =

American journalist and senior editor at Skeptic

Frank Miele (born c. 1955) is an American journalist and senior editor at Skeptic. He is best known for his advocacy of the concept of race, as well as defending the hereditarian hypotheses in its relation to race and intelligence.

Miele earned his B.A. in psychology in 1970 and an M.S. in 1972 from the University of Georgia where he studied under psychologist R. Travis Osborne. While an undergraduate, he became a regular contributor to Mankind Quarterly and collaborated with Donald A. Swan and A. James Gregor. He has also worked as a research assistant and consultant for Richard Lynn.

He made his first contribution to Skeptic in 1994. He has held interviews with notable figures from various disciplines including evolutionists Richard Dawkins and E. O. Wilson, anthropologists Donald Johanson, Lionel Tiger, and Robin Fox, and psychologist Robert Sternberg.

== Selected bibliography ==
- Kistler, Walter; Miele, Frank (2003). Reflections on Life: Science, Religion, Truth, Ethics, Success, Society. Bellevue: Foundation for the Future. ISBN 0-9677252-8-3.
- Miele, Frank (2002). Intelligence, Race, And Genetics: Conversations with Arthur R. Jensen. Oxford: Westview Press. ISBN 0-8133-4274-0.
- Sarich, Vincent; Miele, (2005). Race: The Reality of Human Differences. Oxford: Westview Press. ISBN 0-8133-4322-4.
