= Deborah Charlesworth =

British evolutionary biologist

Deborah Charlesworth: FRS; FRSE
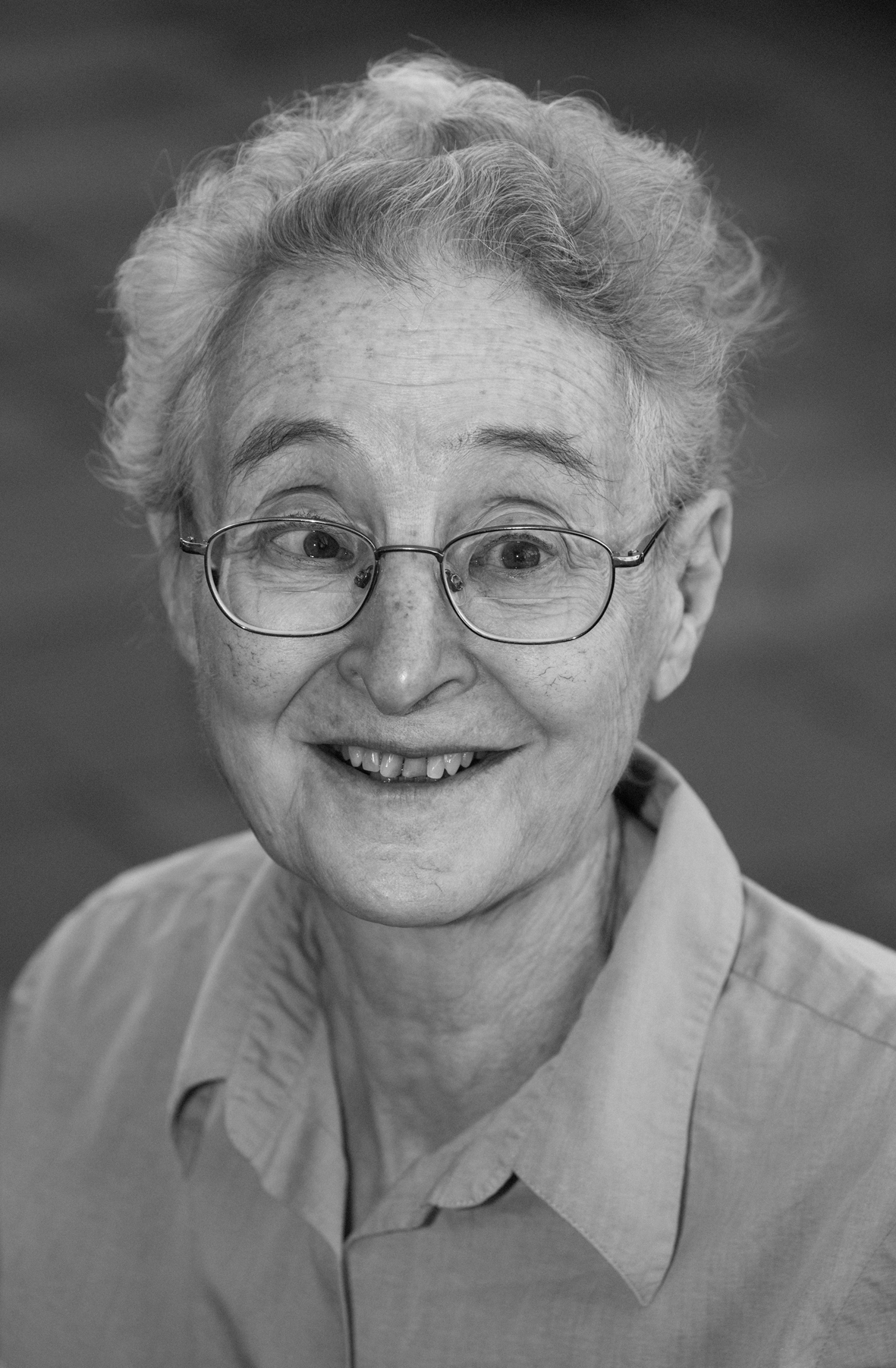
- Born: Deborah Maltby; 13 March 1943 (age 83)
- Citizenship: British
- Education: University of Cambridge
- Spouse: Brian Charlesworth (m. 1967)
- Children: 1 daughter
- Awards: Lifetime Achievement Award by the Society for the Study of Evolution (2020); Genetics Society Medal (2019)
- Scientific career
- Fields: Evolutionary biology
- Workplaces: University of Liverpool; University of Sussex; University of Chicago; University of Edinburgh
- Thesis: Biometrical studies of some biochemical characters in the mouse (1969)
- Doctoral students: Philip Awadalla
- Other notable students: Gilean McVean (postdoc)

Deborah Charlesworth FRS FRSE (née Maltby; born 1943) is a population geneticist from the UK, notable for her important discoveries in population genetics and evolutionary biology. Her most notable research is in understanding the evolution of recombination, sex chromosomes and mating system for plants.

== Early life and education ==
Charlesworth grew up in a London suburb, and from a young age was very interested in the natural world around her.

Although Charlesworth initially studied biochemistry, genetic variation played a significant role from the beginning her research. Charlesworth obtained her doctorate at Cambridge University in 1968 with her thesis focusing on the quantitative genetics of mice, specifically the extent of genetic variation in the blood glucose levels across natural strains.

== Research career ==
Charlesworth continued her research at Cambridge and Chicago as a research fellow in human genetics examining amino acid variations in hemoglobins in human populations. Charlesworth's interest in evolutionary biology continued through her collaboration with Brian Charlesworth, specifically their works on mimicry systems and recombination rates causing her to shift her focus to evolution. She continued her post-doctoral research at, University of Chicago, University of Liverpool and University of Sussex as Brian Charlesworth took positions at each, causing her to do research without financial support. She was mentored at Cambridge by Hermann Lehmann.

From 1988 - 1997, at the age of 45, Charlesworth obtained her first faculty position, teaching at University of Chicago. By this time, Charlesworth had already published ~50 articles. Charlesworth was then appointed to a Professorial Research Fellowship at the University of Edinburgh.

She is best known for her work on the evolution of genetic self-incompatibility in plants and is recognised as a leader in that field. According to the Web of Science she has published over 300 articles in peer-reviewed journals. These articles have been cited over 10,000 times and she has an h-index of 53. She has been married since 1967 to the British evolutionary biologist Brian Charlesworth, who she ended up working in population genetics with.

== Awards and honors ==
Charlesworth was elected a Fellow of the Royal Society of Edinburgh in 2001 and a Fellow of the Royal Society (FRS) in 2005. In 2011, Charlesworth was awarded the Molecular Ecology Prize. Charlesworth was awarded the Genetics Society Medal 2019. She was awarded a Lifetime Achievement Award by the Society for the Study of Evolution in January 2020. In 2022, she was elected to the National Academy of Sciences.

== Selected publications ==
- Charlesworth, D, Wright, SI. (2001) Breeding systems and genome evolution. Current Opinion in Genetics & Development 11, 685–690.
- Jesper S. Bechsgaard, Vincent Castric, Deborah Charlesworth, Xavier Vekemans, Mikkel H. Schierup. 2006. The transition to self-compatibility in Arabidopsis thaliana and evolution within S-haplotypes over 10 million years. Molecular Biology and Evolution 23: 1741–1750.
- Asher D. Cutter, Scott E. Baird and Deborah Charlesworth. 2006 Patterns of nucleotide polymorphism and the decay of linkage disequilibrium in wild populations of Caenorhabditis remanei. Genetics 174: 901–913.
- Bergero, R., A. Forrest, E. Kamau, and D. Charlesworth. 2007. Evolutionary strata on the X chromosomes of the dioecious plant Silene latifolia: evidence from new sex-linked genes. Genetics 175:1945-1954.
- D. Charlesworth 2006 Balancing selection and its effects on sequences in nearby genome regions. PLoS Genetics 2: e64 DOI: 10.1371/journal.pgen.0020064.
- S. Qiu, R. Bergero, A. Forrest, V. Kaiser, D. Charlesworth 2010 Nucleotide diversity in Silene latifolia autosomal and sex-linked genes. Proceedings of the Royal Soc. 277: 3283-3290 (doi:10.1098/rspb.2010.0606).
- Bergero, R., and D. Charlesworth, 2011 Preservation of the Y transcriptome in a 10MY old plant sex chromosome system. Current Biology 21: 1470–1474.
- Jordan, C., and D. Charlesworth, 2012 The potential for sexually antagonistic polymorphism in different genome regions. Evolution 66: 505–516. DOI: 10.1111/j.1558-5646.2011.01448.x

== Bibliography ==
- Introduction to Plant Population Biology (with Jonathan W Silvertown) ISBN 0-632-04991-X
- Evolution: A Very Short Introduction (with Brian Charlesworth) OUP ISBN 0-19-280251-8
