= Philip Awadalla =

Canadian geneticist (born 1969)

- Born: Philip Awadalla; 7 November 1969 (age 56); Canada
- Education: University of Toronto (MSc); University of Edinburgh (PhD)
- Known for: Global genomics; Mutation and early disease progression; Population cohort studies
- Awards: Killam Laureate 2000; Genome Quebec Recruitment Award 2010; Quebec Discovery of the Year 2011; Canadian Society for Clinical Investigation Young Investigators Award 2012; Queens University Haust Distinguished Lecturer; Academy of Science of South Africa Distinguished Visiting Scholar 2015; Google Cloud Innovator
- Scientific career
- Workplaces: University of Oxford; University of Toronto; Ontario Institute for Cancer Research; University of Montreal
- Thesis: (2001)
- Doctoral advisor: Deborah Charlesworth
- Other academic advisors: Kermit Ritland; Charles Langley
- Doctoral students: Professor Julie Hussin
- Other notable students: Professor Alan Hodgkinson
- Website: pawadallalab.org

Philip Awadalla is the Professor of Molecular Genetics at the Nuffield Department of Population Health, and Associate Director of the Big Data Institute at the University of Oxford. He is also a Status-Only Full Professor at the University of Toronto Faculty of Medicine. He is the National Scientific Director of the Canadian Partnership for Tomorrow's Health (CanPath), formerly the Canadian Partnership for Tomorrow Project (CPTP), and executive director of the Ontario Health Study. He was the Executive Scientific Director of the Genome Canada Genome Technology Platform, the Canadian Data Integration Centre. Professor Awadalla was also the Executive Scientific Director of the CARTaGENE biobank, a regional cohort member of the CPTP, from 2009 to 2015, and is currently a scientific advisor for this and other scientific and industry platforms. At the OICR, he was the Director of Computational Biology.

== Career ==
Philip Awadalla completed his Ph.D at the University of Edinburgh, Scotland under the supervision of Deborah Charlesworth in 2001. He then completed a Killam Trust Fellowship and Wellcome Trust postdoctoral fellowships under the supervision of Sarah Otto at the University of British Columbia (2001) and Charles Langley at the University of California, Davis (US) (2001–2003).

In 2004, Awadalla was appointed as assistant professor at the Department of Genetics and Centre for Bioinformatics (led by Bruce Weir) at North Carolina State University. His work there included identifying potential genetic targets for vaccines to Plasmodium falciparum, the main malaria parasite. This has included the first genetic maps and mapping of drug resistance genes in malaria.

In 2007 Awadalla, he became an associate professor in the department of pediatrics at the Université de Montréal, and in 2009 he became the Executive Scientific Director of the CARTaGENE Biobank of Québec. His research focused on developing next-generation genomics platforms to support to pediatric disease research and discovery of rare mutations. Awadalla discovered the relationship of a histone methylating factor encoded by the gene PRDM9 and child-hood acute lymphoblastic leukemia.

Research by Awadalla (with Matthew Hurles of the Wellcome Trust Sanger Institute) was first to directly estimate the number of mutations passed on by individual parents to human offspring, fewer than was previously estimated. Other discoveries include large scale RNA methylation and its genetic control in human mitochondria and the impact of population size on negative selection in humans. The Awadalla team were also the first to show the impact of air pollution on gene expression and disease among thousands of individuals in the Quebec population.

Awadalla is part of a number of collaborative programmes, including the analysis and functional analysis groups of the 1000 Genomes Project and the Pan Cancer Analysis of Whole Genomes Program.
