= Joondalup Family Health Study =

Cohort study

The Joondalup Family Health Study (JFHS) will be an extensively characterized, community-based cohort study, which will investigate the complex interplay of environmental, lifestyle and genetic components that affect the risk of common conditions such as asthma, heart disease and diabetes. The Study will take place in Joondalup, Western Australia and will have a strong focus on families and the health of both children and adults.

The Study is being led by a team of researchers from Western Australian Institute for Medical Research, The University of Western Australia, Edith Cowan University, Curtin University, Lions Eye Institute and Ear Science Institute Australia.

== Patrons ==
His Excellency Dr Kenneth Comninos Michael AC, Governor of Western Australia is the Patron of the JFHS.

Clinical Professor Fiona Wood AM is the Medical Patron of the JFHS.

== Study Design ==
This longitudinal study will seek to collect extensive data (over 3,000 measures on each person) from up to 80,000 participants, who will be asked to undergo a comprehensive health check approximately every 3 years. The appointment will include questions about lifestyle and diet, in addition to height, weight and other tests such as heart, lung, vision and hearing tests.

=== Phase 1 ===
JFHS Phase 1 will pilot the Study with 2,000 participants, ~ 700 nuclear families, including adults and children (6 years and up). Phase 1 will also be a stand-alone study, which will produce validated research methods, data and analysis.

Phase 1 will collect data on under-researched but important conditions in the Australian community. The areas chosen cover both clinical and social areas of health:

- Allergies
- Cardiovascular disease
- Child health and development
- Cognitive psychology
- Ears and hearing disorders
- Exercise physiology
- Eye and vision disorders
- Diabetes
- General practice
- Metabolic disease
- Paediatric respiratory medicine
- Social determinants of health
- Spinal pain

=== Phase 2 ===
JFHS Phase 2 will expand on the JFHS Phase 1 cohort and seek to collect over 3,500 measures from up to 80,000 volunteers from Joondalup every three years.

In addition to the research areas described in Phase 1, detailed parameters will be collected within the following major research areas:

- Cancer
- Cardiovascular disease
- Education
- Environmental health
- Infectious disease
- Nutrition and endocrinology
- Obstetrics and gynaecology
- Paediatric health
- Psychology
- Renal disease
- Respiratory health
- Speech and literacy

== Participation ==
=== Eligibility ===
For Phase 1, participants will be a community-based, randomly selected sample of 2000 eligible individuals living in the community of Joondalup. Only households in which two or more generations of families are living together with children over the age of 6 years will be studied.

For Phase 2, all residents living in Joondalup will be eligible to participate.

=== What participation involves ===
Participants who choose to take part in the JFHS will be asked to complete a questionnaire on their medical history, behaviours and lifestyle, mental health and community participation. They will also be asked to attend the Health & Wellness Building at Edith Cowan University to have physical measurements taken. Participants will also be asked for a blood sample.

== Community consultation ==
An extensive program of community outreach has been conducted by the JFHS team. This included a detailed postal survey of 7,500 residents and a Community Forum. Of those who responded (16% of total surveyed), 96% believed that it was very or quite important to conduct a large-scale family health study; 85% were very or quite interested in participating in the JFHS; and 85% were very or quite likely to allow their children to participate.

Metropolitan general practitioners were also surveyed on their views on a genome health project. This survey found that most GPs were supportive of such a project, and the majority of those surveyed would be willing to discuss and recruit patients for the project.

Other outreach activities have included briefing members of parliament, information stalls at Lakeside Joondalup, interactive displays and articles in community and council newsletters.

== Endorsements ==
=== Government ===
The JFHS has been endorsed by community leaders representing the City of Joondalup - including local, state and federal parliamentarians.

=== Health organisations ===
Western Australian health groups who have endorsed the JFHS include:

- AusBiotech
- Association for the Blind of WA
- Australian Medical Association, WA Branch
- Biotechnology Australia
- Diabetes WA
- Joondalup Health Campus
- The McCusker Foundation for Alzheimer's Disease Research
- Royal Perth Hospital
- Sir Charles Gairdner Hospital
- St John of God Hospital
- Women's and Infants Research Foundation

=== National and international endorsements ===
National and international organisations who have endorsed the JFHS include:

- Australian Genome Alliance
- Public Population Project in Genomics Consortium (P3G), a non-for-profit international consortium to promote collaboration between researchers in the field of population genomics.

=== Other ===
- Cerner Corporation
- Committee for Perth
- IBM
- Scitech

== Other studies ==
The Joondalup Family Health Study will build on the experience of a number of previous large cohort studies that have been conducted in Western Australia, including the Busselton Health Study, the Health-in-Men Study, and the Raine Study.

== Sources ==
- Trivedi, Bijal (23 April 2008). "Biomedical science: Betting the bank". Nature. 452 (7190): 926–929. doi:10.1038/452926a. PMID 18441548.
