= Egyptomania in the United States =

19th century American interest in ancient Egypt

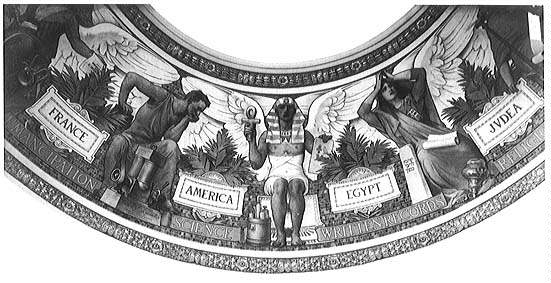
"Evolution of Civilization", a portion of the mural by Edwin Blashfield (1895) above the Main Reading Room of the Library of Congress. The image suggests a special relationship between Egypt as the first and America as the latest civilization.

Egyptomania refers to a period of renewed interest in the culture of ancient Egypt, that has influenced Western art, architecture, and design for centuries, particularly that of the United States of America.

Though very few Americans could afford a trip to Egypt during the peak of Egyptomania and only made contact with Egyptian culture through literature, art, and architecture, the fascination with ancient Egypt was manifest through American literature, architecture, art, film, politics and religion. Particularly influential were Vivant Denon's Voyage dans la Basse et la Haute Égypte, the Institute of Egypt's Description de l'Égypte, and Verdi's Aida.

Later on in the 1920s, the discovery of the Tomb of Tutankhamun considerably revived American interest in Egypt, which was manifest in some architecture of the time, such as Grauman's Egyptian Theatre in Hollywood and the Fred F. French Building in New York.

== In culture ==
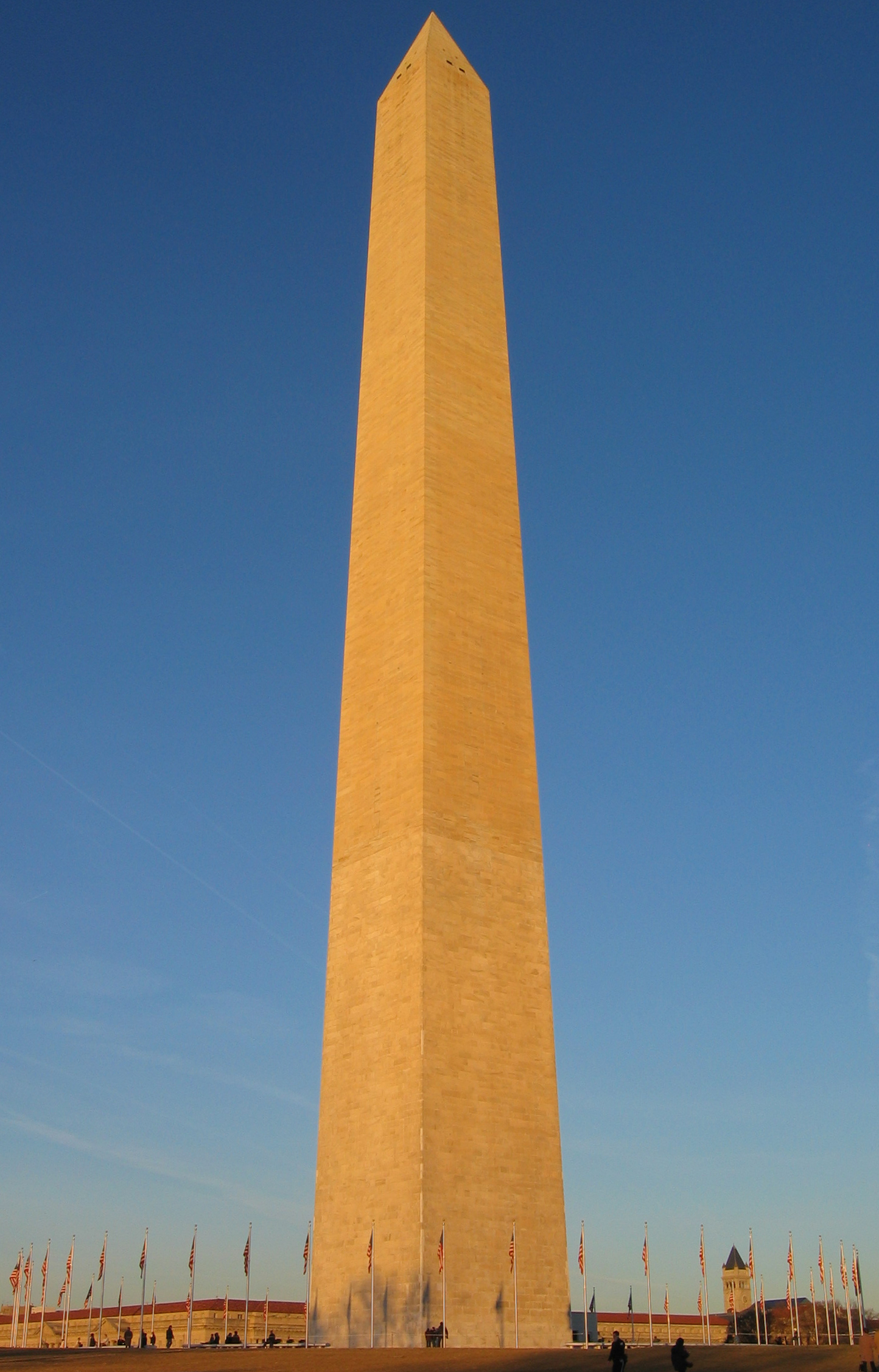
Washington Monument in Washington, D.C.

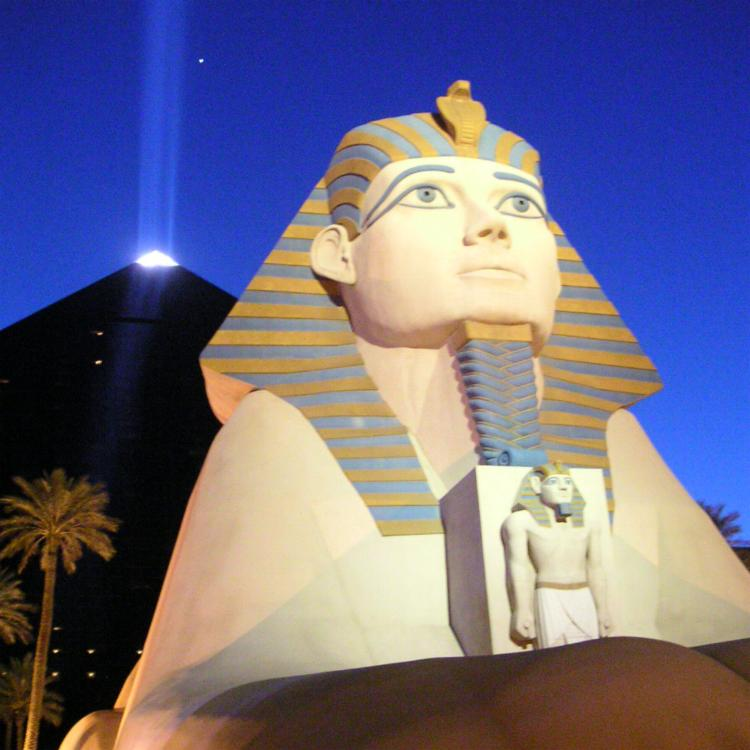
Luxor Hotel in Las Vegas, Nevada

American literature, visual art and architecture absorbed what was becoming general knowledge about ancient Egyptian culture, making use of this knowledge in contemporary debate about national identity, race, and slavery. Elements of Egyptian culture became particularly symbolically charged. The mummy, for example, represented an American (or perhaps broadly Western) fascination with the living dead and reanimation. This went so far that 'mummy unwrapping parties' were organized.

Beyond entertainment, Egyptian mummies were also imported into the United States for industrial purposes, such as the manufacture of paper from their linen wrappings. This practice raised ethical debates.

The figure of Cleopatra, hieroglyphic writing and deciphering, and the pyramid as a maze are other examples of how ancient Egypt has captivated Western imaginations, and specifically in the United States since the nineteenth century. Literary works that make use of these symbolic references to Egypt include "Some Words With a Mummy" by Edgar Allan Poe, "Lost in a Pyramid, or The Mummy's Curse" by Louisa May Alcott or The Marble Faun by Nathaniel Hawthorne. The impact of ancient Egyptian culture in architecture is called the Egyptian Revival, an expression of neoclassicism and later on Art Deco especially in the United States. Egyptian images, forms and symbols were integrated in the contemporary style. This influence can best be seen in the architecture of cemeteries, such as the use of obelisks as headstones, and prisons.

Egyptian Revival symbols and architecture was used for cemetery gateways, tombstones, and public memorials in the 19th and early 20th century. In the American South, Egyptomania took on a distinctive ideological dimension. Beyond architectural trends, some Southern intellectuals and pro-slavery theorists invoked Ancient Egypt as a historical precedent for a hierarchical, slave-based civilization. They portrayed Egypt as a model of social order and cultural refinement, using its legacy to justify the Southern plantation system. This symbolic appropriation of Egypt supported the narrative of slavery as a “natural” and “civilized” institution. Egyptian motifs were also adopted in Southern funerary architecture and public monuments, especially in cities like Richmond and Memphis, where the Nile became a metaphor for the Mississippi. Pyramid Mausoleums, flat-roofed mastabas, lotus columns, obelisks, and sphinxes were popular in 19th century rural or garden cemeteries. For example, the gateways of Mount Auburn Cemetery in Boston, Massachusetts and Grove Street Cemetery in New Haven, Connecticut were constructed in the Egyptian Revival style.

Other examples of this influence are Luxor Hotel, Washington Monument, several theaters and movie palaces, and many other buildings. Movies such as The Mummy (1999) (itself a remake of a 1932 Boris Karloff film) and its sequels demonstrate that ancient Egypt and the discovery of its secrets are still of interest for contemporary western minds. Scholarly texts about this phenomenon in American culture include Scott Trafton's Egypt Land (2004) and M. J. Schueller's U.S. Orientalism (1998).

== Race and national identity in the United States ==
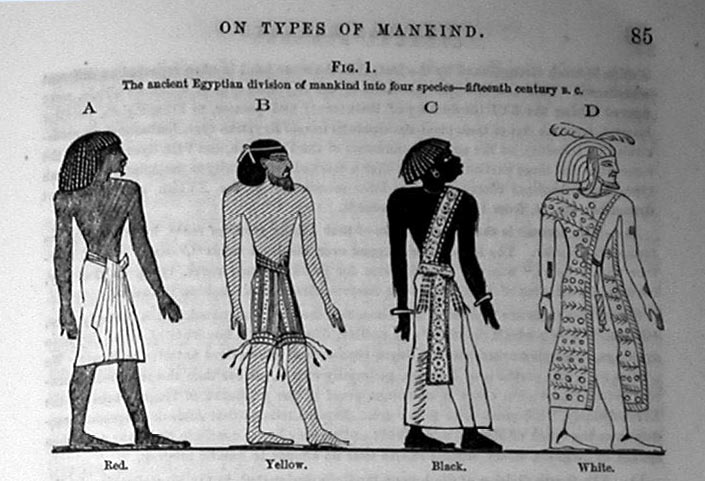
Illustration from Types of Mankind (1854), which shows a copy of an Egyptian wall painting used to show that there were different 'types' (or 'species') of humans as far back as ancient Egypt. Types uses this as support for its theory of polygenesis.

According to Richard White, Egypt is not easily placed within Africa or Asia, or within the East or the West. Therefore, it seems as if Egypt is "everybody's past". The figure of Egypt has been a point of reference in the development of national identity in the western World, though these processes of identity formation are complex and involve many factors. Racial identity is central to these processes, particularly in the United States, where the emerging sense of a distinct national identity and the increasing conflict over slavery were linked in the first half of the 19th century.

Paschal Beverly Randolph crystallized the way in which Egypt served as a model for the new nation when he said, "For America, read Africa; for the United States, Egypt" (1863). Among the variety of ethnic groups that formed the population of the United States, the common denominator was being non-black, being able to define oneself using a binaristic Other.

Historically, the attempt to scientifically establish a racial hierarchy as undertaken by the American School of Ethnology evoked an understanding of whiteness as the natural American national identity. The racial identity of Egyptian pharaohs was used especially by 19th century scientists such as Samuel George Morton and his contemporaries to confirm the contemporary American racial hierarchy. This hierarchy served proponents of slavery to justify the inhuman treatment of slaves and the denial of civil rights for any but white Americans.

Craniology was also used to determine whether Egyptians were black or white, a debate lead in light of the justification of slavery. A key figure of this debate, Samuel George Morton, founder of the American School of Ethnology, put forward the theory of Polygenesis, claiming that there is not one but several human races who are in a hierarchical order with whites at the top and blacks at the bottom end of the scale. Although science today disapproves of Morton's findings it still revalidated his professional status, because Morton's American School was to a large degree responsible for the development of the current professional status of the sciences and the renunciation of puritan ideas of monogenesis and the Christian clerical worldview, which was common at the time.

Types of Mankind (1854), the culmination of American School racial thinking, contains a chapter on the racial characteristics of the ancient Egyptians, starting a controversy that still rages today. For example, Vincent Sarich and Frank Miele's Race: The Reality of Human Differences (2004), a recent attempt to add academic credibility to the scientifically discredited notion that "race" constitutes an essential rather than a culturally constructed human difference, uses Egypt in a similar way. Historians have put forward three main hypotheses which clearly contradict each other.

== See also ==
- List of pyramid mausoleums in North America
