= Bartha Maria Knoppers =

Canadian lawyer and scientist

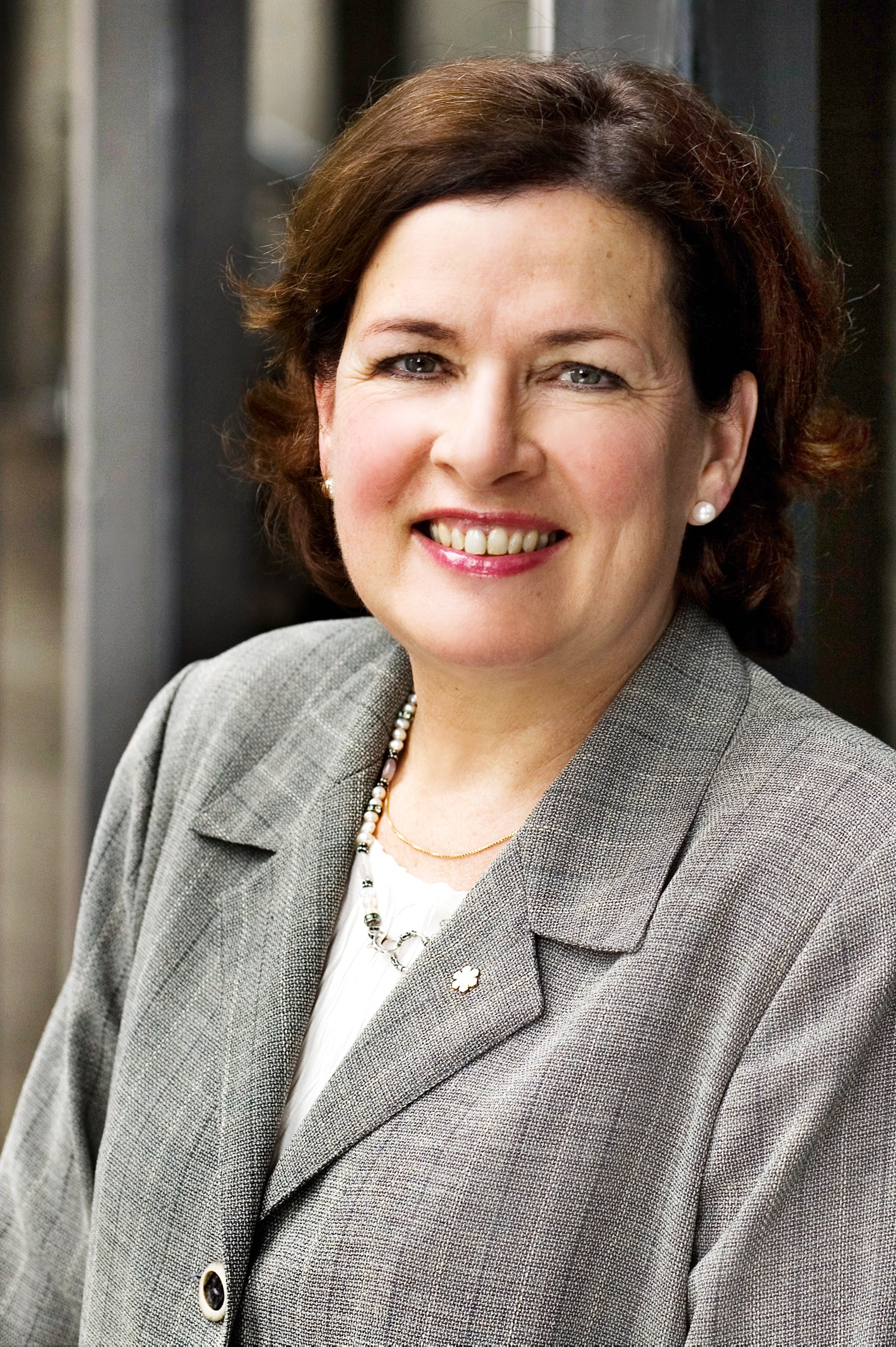
- Bartha Maria Knoppers
- Born: May 26, 1951 (age 75); Hilversum, Netherlands
- Education: McMaster University; University of Alberta; McGill University; University of Cambridge; University of Paris 1 Pantheon-Sorbonne
- Employer(s): Université de Montréal; McGill University

Bartha Maria Knoppers, OC OQ (born May 26, 1951) is a Canadian law Professor, an expert on the ethical aspects of genetics, genomics and biotechnology and a Distinguished James McGill Professor Emerita.

Born in Hilversum, the Netherlands, she received a Bachelor of Arts (French and English Literature) from McMaster University (1972), a Master of Arts degree in comparative literature from the University of Alberta (1974), Bachelor of Common Law (1978) and Civil Law (1981) degrees from McGill University, where she was the Executive Editor for the McGill Law Journal, a Diploma of Advanced Studies from the University of Paris 1 Pantheon-Sorbonne (1979), a Diploma of Legal Studies from University of Cambridge (1981), and a Doctorate of Laws from the University of Paris 1 Pantheon-Sorbonne (1985). In addition, she became a member of the Quebec Bar (1985).

She was a Full professor at the Faculty of Law, Université de Montréal (1985-2009), as well as at the Department of Human Genetics, Faculty of Medicine and Health Sciences, McGill University (2009-2024), and, an Associate Member of the Faculty of Law (2011) and the Biomedical Ethics Unit (2013). She retired in 2024 and was named Distinguished James McGill Professor Emerita. She is also the Founding Director of the Centre of Genomics and Policy, McGill University (2009-2024), and the Founder and Chair of the Public Population Project in Genomics (P^{3}G) Consortium and CARTaGENE, Quebec (2007-2019). In 2024, she founded the Bioethics Council for Canada (Conseil canadien de bioéthique) and has served as its Chair since its establishment.

Prof. Knoppers held the Tier 1 Canada Research Chair in Law and Medicine from 2001-2024. This involved analyzing and developing national and international policies, laws and guidelines in the field of genomics and children's right. She is Co-Founder and a Board Member of the Board of Directors of the Global Alliance for Genomics and Health (GA4GH) (2013-2027) and Co-Chair of the Governance Ethics Working Group for the Human Cell Atlas (HCA) (2018-2024). Previously, Prof. Knoppers was the Chair of the International Ethics Committee of the Human Genome Organisation (HUGO) (1996-2004), the Chair of the Ethics and Policy Committee of the International Cancer Genome Consortium (ICGC) (2009-2017), and the Chair of the Ethics Working Group of the World Anti-Doping Agency (WADA) (2015-2021). She was a member of UNESCO’s International Bioethics Committee (1994 to 2004) and helped draft UNESCO’s Universal Declaration on the Human Genome and Human Rights (1997) and then in 2017, OECD’s Recommendation on Health Data Governance.

During the COVID-19 pandemic, she participated as a member of the COVID-19 Vaccine Task Force convened by the National Research Council Canada and Innovation, Science and Economic Development Canada. In 2020, she was appointed to the International Commission on the Clinical Use of Human Germline Genome Editing.

Prof. Knoppers has published over 585 peer-reviewed articles, over 117 book chapters and 38 books (chapter/editor/author). She is the lead author of the Stem Cell Charter (2010) and co-edited the Routledge Handbook of Medical Law and Ethics (2014). Her work has been featured in various peer-reviewed academic journals, such as SCIENCE, Nature, BMJ Open, Frontiers in Genetics, to name a few. Notably, the last decade has primarily been dedicated to building the Global Alliance for Genomics and Health (GA4GH) and the drafting and realization of its Framework for the Responsible Sharing of Genomic and Health-Related Data, a living guidance instrument that was translated into 14 languages.

== Honours ==
In 2002, Prof. Knoppers was made an Officer of the Order of Canada in recognition for being "a world authority on the ethical aspects of genetics, genomics and biotechnology". She was also made an Officer of the National Order of Quebec (2012), and a Commander of the Order of Montréal (2016). She holds five Doctorate Honoris Causa: Doctor of Laws from the University of Waterloo (2001); Doctor of Medicine from the University of Paris V – René Descartes (2002); Doctor of Laws from McMaster University (2007); Doctor of Laws from the University of Alberta (2008); and Doctor of Laws from the University of British Columbia (2024).

She was elected as a Fellow of the American Association for the Advancement of Science (2002), and is a Fellow of the Hastings Center (2000), an independent bioethics research institution. In addition, Prof. Knoppers was a member of the AAAS' Committee on Scientific Freedom and Responsibility (2019-23), and is a Fellow of the Canadian Academy of Health Sciences (CAHS) (2005), the Royal Society of Canada’s Academy of Social Sciences (2017), and the Galton Institute (2017). She is a Senior Fellow for the PHG Foundation, University of Cambridge, UK (2019) and of the Centre of Medicine, Ethics and Law, University of Hong Kong (2014). She gave the Galton Lecture in November 2017 and the Baron de Lancey Lecture in 2022 (UK).

Prof. Knoppers has received numerous awards for her academic achievements. Her most recent recognitions include the Henry G. Friesen International Prize in Health Research (2019), the Till and McCulloch Award for science policy (2020), and the Canadian Bioethics Society Lifetime Achievement award (2021) in recognition of her significant contributions to healthcare ethics through her scholarship and leadership. In 2025, she was awarded the McGill University Medal for Exceptional Academic Achievement. In 2026, she received the Trailblazer Award as part of the Stem Cell Network (SCN) 25 for 25 Silver Anniversary Awards and was named an inductee to the Canadian Medical Hall of Fame.
