= Gene orders =

Gene order is the permutation of genome arrangement. A fair amount of research has been done trying to determine whether gene orders evolve according to a molecular clock (molecular clock hypothesis) or in jumps (punctuated equilibrium). By comparing gene orders in dissimilar organisms, scientists are able to develop a molecular phylogeny tree. When organisms have similar gene orders, meaning they have likely diverged recently, it is called synteny.

Some research on gene orders in animals' mitochondrial genomes reveals that the mutation rate of gene orders is not a constant in some degrees.

Methods for genome mapping, determining the gene order, include:

- Radiation hybrid mapping
- Genetic linkage mapping (recombinant frequency)
- Fluorescent in situ hybridization (FISH)
- Restriction mapping
- Sequence-tagged site content mapping
- Southern hybridization
- PCR
- Whole genome sequencing (increasingly used as the costs of sequencing decline)

All of these methods can lead to a gene sequence or a DNA sequence by which genes can be identified and compared.
