= Race: The Reality of Human Difference =

2004 book by Vincent Sarich

Race: The Reality of Human Differences
- Author: Vincent Sarich, Frank Miele
- Publisher: Basic Books
- Publication date: January 2004
- Pages: 304
- ISBN: 0-8133-4086-1

Race: The Reality of Human Differences is an anthropology book, in which authors Vincent M. Sarich, Emeritus Professor of Anthropology at the University of California, Berkeley, and Frank Miele, senior editor of Skeptic Magazine, argue for the reality of race, a view rejected by modern science. The book was published by Basic Books in 2004.

It particularly disputes the statements of the PBS documentary Race: The Power of an Illusion aired in 2003.

After arguing that human races exist, the authors put forth three different political systems that take race into account in the final chapter, "Learning to Live with Race." These are "Meritocracy in the Global Marketplace", "Affirmative Action and Race Norming", and "Resegregation and the Emergence of Ethno-States." Sarich and Miele list the advantages and disadvantages of each system and advocate Global Meritocracy as the best of the three options. The authors then discuss "the horrific prospect of ethnically targeted weapons," which they view as technically feasible but not very likely to be used.
