= Relative rate test =

Genetic test measuring evolution by comparing species

The relative rate test is a genetic comparative test between two ingroups (somewhat closely related species) and an outgroup or “reference species” to compare mutation and evolutionary rates between the species. Each ingroup species is compared independently to the outgroup to determine how closely related the two species are without knowing the exact time of divergence from their closest common ancestor. If more change has occurred on one lineage relative to another lineage since their shared common ancestor, then the outgroup species will be more different from the faster-evolving lineage's species than it is from the slower-evolving lineage's species. This is because the faster-evolving lineage will, by definition, have accumulated more differences since the common ancestor than the slower-evolving lineage. This method can be applied to averaged data (i.e., groups of molecules), or individual molecules. It is possible for individual molecules to show evidence of approximately constant rates of change in different lineages even while the rates differ between different molecules. The relative rate test is a direct internal test of the molecular clock, for a given molecule and a given set of species, and shows that the molecular clock does not need to be (and should never be) assumed: It can be directly assessed from the data itself. Note that the logic can also be applied to any kind of data for which a distance measure can be defined (e.g., even morphological features).

== Uses ==
The initial use of this method was to assess whether or not there was evidence for different rates of molecular change in different lineages for particular molecules. If there was no evidence of significantly different rates, this would be direct evidence of a molecular clock, and (only) then would allow for a phylogeny to be constructed based on relative branch points (absolute dates for branch points in the phylogeny would require further calibration with the best-attested fossil evidence). Sarich and Wilson used the method to show that approximately the same amount of change had occurred in albumin in both the human (Homo sapiens) and chimpanzee (Pan troglodytes) lineages since their common ancestor. This was done by showing that both human and chimpanzee albumin were equally different from, e.g., monkey albumin. They found the same pattern for other Primate species (i.e., equidistant from an outgroup comparison), which allowed them to then create a relative phylogenetic tree (hypothesis of evolutionary branching order) of Primates. When calibrated with well-attested fossil evidence (for example, no Primates of modern aspect before the K-T boundary), this led them to argue that the human-chimp split had occurred only ~5 million years ago (which was much younger than previously supposed by paleontologists).

Two other important uses for the relative rate test are to determine if and how generation time and metabolic processes affect mutational rate. Firstly is generation time. Sarich and Wilson first used the relative rate test to show that there was no evidence of a generation effect on lineage mutation rates for albumin within primates. Using 4 carnivore species as outgroups, they showed that humans (with much longer generation times) had not accumulated significantly fewer (or greater) molecular changes than had other primates in their sample (e.g., rhesus monkeys, spider monkeys, and various prosimians all of which have much shorter generation times). However, a famous experiment comparing eleven genes between mice or rats to humans, with pig, cow, goat, dog, and rabbits acting as an outgroup reference, suggested that rodents had faster mutation rates. Rodents have a much shorter generation time than humans, and so it was suggested that they would be expected to have much faster mutation rates, and so evolve faster. This theory was supported through testing coding regions and untranslated regions with the relative rate test (which showed that rodents had a mutation rate much higher than humans) and backed up by comparing paralogous genes because they are homologous via gene duplication and not speciation and so the comparison is independent of the time of divergence.

The other use of the test is to determine the effect of metabolic processes. It had previously been believed that birds have a much slower molecular evolutionary rate than other animals, such as mammals, but that was based solely on the small genetic differences between birds, which relied on the fossil record. This was later confirmed with the relative rate test, however the theory was that this was because of metabolic rate and a lower body temperature in birds. Mindell’s paper explains that there was no direct correlation found between these and molecular evolution in the test taxa of birds based on mitochondrial evolution, but birds as a whole do have a lower mutation rate. There are still many hypotheses in this area of study that are being tested, but the relative rate test is proving crucial in order to overcome the fossil record bias.

Although these are specific instances of the relative rate test, it may also be used to compare species for phylogenetic purposes. For example, Easteal wanted to compare nucleotide substitution rates in four genes of four eutherian mammals. He did this via the relative rate test and then, using this data, he was able to construct a phylogeny using various methods, including parsimony and maximum likelihood. He took the same approach in another experiment to compare humans to other primates, and found no significant difference in evolutionary rates.

== Pros and Cons ==
It is generally agreed that the relative rate test has many strengths that make it invaluable for experimenters. For example, using this test, the date of divergence between two species is not needed. Also, a generalized test minimizes sampling bias and the bias of the fossil record. However, the relative rate test is very poor in some areas, such as detecting major differences compared to rate constancy if it is being used as a test for the molecular clock. Robinson claims that for this test, size does matter. The relative rate test may have a problem picking up significant variations if the tested sequences are less than one thousand nucleotides. This may be because variations are within the expected error of the test, and because there are so few nucleotides to compare, there is no way to be absolutely sure. So, the relative rate test is strong by itself, but it is usually not the only basis for a conclusion. It tends to be paired with other tests, such as branch length or two-cluster tests in order to make sure conclusions are accurate and not based on faulty results.
