= Global public–private partnership =

Mary Ryckman, Assistant United States Trade Representative, Discusses Partnerships for Development

Global public–private partnership (GPPP) is a governance mechanism to foster public–private partnership (PPP) cooperation between an international intergovernmental organisation like the United Nations, certain civil society actors with a state in the issue and private companies working in the same issue area.

The distinguishing feature of these multi-stakeholder initiatives fthat sets them apart from traditional inter-governmental organizations is their mixed public-private composition. That is, they are alliances of government agencies and international organizations with either corporations or elements of civil society. They are mechanisms of 'global policy making' and some have developed into transnational bureaucracies.

Existing GPPPs strive, among other things, to increase affordable access to essential drugs in developing countries, and to promote handwashing with soap to reduce diarrhoea. (see Global Handwashing Day)

Some of the work of the World Health Organization (WHO) may be considered global public–private partnerships (GPPPs). The WHO is financed through the UN system by contributions from member states. In recent years, WHO's work has involved more collaboration with NGOs and the pharmaceutical industry in Product development partnerships to create vaccines for diseases that primarily afflict third world countries. The WHO also works closely with foundations such as the Bill and Melinda Gates Foundation and the Rockefeller Foundation. In 2012, 15% of WHO's total revenues was financed by private sources.

GPPPs are an example of multistakeholder governance which is a key target of United Nations Sustainable Development Goal 17. In particular, target 17.17 is formulated as: "Encourage effective partnerships: Encourage and promote effective public, public-private and civil society partnerships, building on the experience and resourcing strategies of partnerships." This target has one Indicator: Indicator 17.17.1 is the "Amount in United States dollars committed to public-private partnerships for infrastructure.

== See also ==
- OECD Development Centre
