= Vincent Sarich =

American paleo-anthropologist (1934–2012)

Vincent M. Sarich
- Born: December 13, 1934; Chicago, Illinois, U.S.
- Died: October 27, 2012 (aged 77); Seattle, Washington, U.S.
- Education: Illinois Institute of Technology (BS); University of California, Berkeley (MA, PhD)
- Known for: Research in human evolution
- Awards: Kistler Prize (2004)
- Scientific career
- Fields: Anthropology
- Workplaces: University of Auckland
- Doctoral advisor: Sherwood Washburn

Vincent Matthew Sarich (December 13, 1934 – October 27, 2012) was an American anthropologist and biochemist. He was Professor Emeritus in anthropology at University of California, Berkeley.

Sarich and his PhD advisor, Allan Wilson, used molecular data to estimate that humans and chimpanzees have a common ancestor just four to five million years ago. Their paper on their finding was published in 1967. At the time, scientists considered the common ancestor to live ten to 30 million years ago, and their revised estimate has become well accepted. Sarich generated controversy with his support for analyzing human behavior and populations in evolutionary terms.

== Early life and education ==
Born in Chicago, he received a bachelor of science in chemistry from Illinois Institute of Technology and his masters and doctorate in anthropology from University of California, Berkeley, where he was supervised by Sherwood Washburn. He was a member of the Department of Anthropology at Stanford from 1967 to 1981, and taught at UC Berkeley from 1966 through 1994.

As a doctoral student, and along with his PhD supervisor Allan Wilson, Sarich measured the strength of immunological cross-reactions of blood serum albumin between pairs of creatures, including humans and African apes (chimpanzees and gorillas). The strength of the reaction could be expressed numerically as an Immunological Distance, which was in turn proportional to the number of amino acid differences between homologous proteins in different species. Sarich and Wilson showed that the pattern of differences between modern species could only be explained if the molecular change along different lineages had in fact accumulated approximately equally (i.e., were a type of 'molecular clock'). This method they called the relative rate test, and it showed that one could empirically test whether the molecular change was constant simply by looking at the pattern of differences between modern forms of the molecule. By constructing a calibration curve of the I.D. of species' pairs with best-attested divergence times in the fossil record, the data could be used as a molecular clock to estimate the times of divergence of pairs with poorer or unknown fossil records.

== Career ==
In their 1967 paper Immunological time scale for hominid evolution in Science, Sarich and Wilson estimated the divergence time of humans and apes as four to five million years ago, at a time when standard interpretations of the fossil record gave this divergence as at least 10 to as much as 30 million years. Their logic first involved showing empirically that the albumins of several Old World Monkey (Cercopithecoidea) species was equally different from human albumin and chimpanzee albumin (within experimental error). This constituted a relative rate test of molecular change, and showed that both human and chimpanzee albumin lineages must have accumulated approximately equal amounts of change since their common ancestor (else one would be more different from the outgroup monkeys than the other), thereby providing direct empirical evidence of an approximate molecular clock for this molecule. This same pattern (i.e., equal distance between any two species and a more distantly related 'outgroup' species) held for all the empirical comparisons they made among primate species (within experimental error). Further work on additional molecules (for example, transferrin and hemoglobin) showed that these had also evolved in an approximate clocklike pattern in different Primate lineages. Phylogenetic trees based on these pattern of species differences were then constructed, though these could only indicate relative branch points, because the molecular differences - though having been shown by the relative rate test to have evolved approximately clocklike over millions of years - could not by themselves indicate how fast or slow the clock was (i.e., how many changes had occurred per unit of time). For this, Sarich and Wilson used the most well-established fossil evidence (In particular: no primates of modern aspect had been found prior to the K-T boundary, ~65 million years ago) to calibrate the tree's branch points. This work on a variety of molecules (and confirmed by modern DNA differences) consistently suggested a recent (~5 million year old) common ancestry with the African apes (chimpanzees and gorillas). Subsequent fossil discoveries, notably Lucy, and reinterpretation of older fossil materials, notably Ramapithecus, showed these younger estimates to be likely correct and have validated the pattern implied initially by Sarich and Wilson's albumin data. Empirical demonstrations that the molecular clock principle held among large groups of organisms (through application of the relative rate test) revolutionized the study of molecular evolution.

Sarich's later work on race strengthened his reputation as a controversial figure. He applied his earlier work to racial differentiation, which he saw as subgroupings below the level of species. He also argued that the smaller the amount of time required to create a given number of morphological difference, the more selectively significant the differences would necessarily be.

Sarich was a proponent of sociobiology, evolutionary psychology, and that racial differences were real and represented evolved geographic populational differences (on average), which often caused him to be the subject of controversy by activists at Berkeley.

In 1994, Sarich was a signatory of a collective statement titled Mainstream Science on Intelligence, written by Linda Gottfredson and published in the Wall Street Journal. Sarich also wrote a defense of The Bell Curve.

After retirement from Berkeley, he occasionally lectured in anthropology at the University of Auckland, New Zealand for a number of years. At the time of his death he was living in Seattle with his daughter, her partner, and his grandson.

== Criticism ==
Some of Sarich's teachings were criticized by some students and faculty, who argued they believed they were not based in science, and his critics said some of his statements were demeaning to women, nonwhites and homosexuals. Other students defended him against these charges, however, and defended his teaching.

In an interview with The New York Times, Sarich agreed with his critics, who stated that there was little or no scientific basis for his claims about homosexuality, or on the relationship that he was then teaching of brain size to intelligence. He told the Times there seems to be a correlation but "there is not a lot of evidence to support that theory because there isn't a lot of research done on the subject." With respect to his discussions on homosexuality, he told the Times "I have to admit that there isn't a lot of foundation behind that. In discussions it was clear that my students had more experience and were more heartfelt about the homosexual issues, and I had to agree with them."

== Bibliography ==
- Sarich VM, Wilson AC. Immunological time scale for hominid evolution. Science 158, 1967, p. 1200-1203.
- Sarich VM, Miele F. Race: The Reality of Human Differences. Westview Press (2004). ISBN 0-8133-4086-1
- Sarich VM. The Final Taboo. Skeptic (Altadena, CA) January 1, 2000. Volume: 8 Issue: 1 Page: 38
- Sarich VM, Dolhinow P. Background for man; readings in physical anthropology ASIN: B00005VHM2
- Zihlman, Adrienne L.; Cronin, John E.; Cramer, Douglas L.; Sarich, Vincent M. (1978). "Pygmy chimpanzee as a possible prototype for the common ancestor of humans, chimpanzees, and gorillas". Nature. 275 (5682): 744–746. Bibcode:1978Natur.275..744Z. doi:10.1038/275744a0. PMID 703839. S2CID 4252525.
- Marks, Jon; Schmid, Carl W.; Sarich, Vincent M. (1988). "DNA hybridization as a guide to phylogeny: Relations of the Hominoidea". Journal of Human Evolution. 17 (8): 769–786. Bibcode:1988JHumE..17..769M. doi:10.1016/0047-2484(88)90065-6.
