= Public Population Project in Genomics =

P^{3}G (Public Population Project in Genomics and Society)
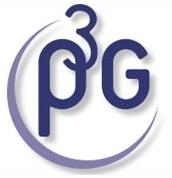
- Formation: 2004
- Purpose: population genetics
- Headquarters: McGill University Genome Quebec Innovation Centre, Montreal (Canada)
- Official language: English
- Website: http://www.p3g.org

P^{3}G (Public Population Project in Genomics and Society) is a not-for-profit international consortium dedicated to facilitating collaboration between researchers and biobanks working in the area of human population genomics. P^{3}G is member-based and composed of experts from the different disciplines in the areas of and related to genomics, including epidemiology, law, ethics, technology, biomolecular science, etc. P^{3}G and its members are committed to a philosophy of information sharing with the goal of supporting researchers working in areas that will improve the health of people around the world.

== The Organization ==
P^{3}G is a not-for-profit organization with members from over 40 countries. Membership falls under two different categories: Institutional and Individual. Institutional members have the right to elect and vote the board of directors of P³G, and all members are eligible for office.

P^{3}G is headquartered in the McGill University Genome Quebec Innovation Centre, Montreal (Canada).

== Scientific Activities ==
=== Online ===
P^{3}G works with its members and other experts to develop tools, methods and resources designed to optimize and harmonize the infrastructures of biobanks and research projects in the areas of population genomics, epidemiology and the environment. The P^{3}G site is completely free and accessible, and all documents, web sites and tools included on the site are non-commercial and open source. Such tools include:

Toolkit - provides the epidemiological, ethical, statistical and IT instruments necessary for the access and use of data. The aim of this platform is to create a one-stop location and open access environment, where key documents are accessible to the research community. The TOOLKIT currently contains over 80 tools across five categories (Epidemiology and Biostatistics, Sample collection and processing, Data collection and processing, GE3LS, other tools).

Lifespan - an open access web platform offering users a step-by-step approach for the development and maintenance of a biobank or a research project within a definitive funding timeline.

HUB - provides an online agora for all those interested in genetic and genomic research, allowing for ongoing discussion, exchange and collaboration on research projects.

Training - provides researchers in the biobanking field with pertinent and up-to-date training opportunities

Catalogs - currently provide information on large population-based biobanks. Over 160 studies, spanning all continents, are presently listed in the database, and this index is regularly updated and curated to include relevant studies.

=== Meetings ===
In addition, P^{3}G bring its members together at meetings in different cities around the world. These gatherings provide members with a unique opportunity to identify and address the challenges the community faces, share innovative strategies and work on new research tools. P^{3}G Meetings have been held in the following cities:

- Montreal (Canada) May 2015
- Phoenix (USA) May 2015
- Helsinki (Finland) September 2014
- Indianapolis (USA) May 2014
- Paris (France) April 2014
- Graz (Austria) September 2013
- Montreal (Canada) Septembre 2013
- Paris (France) May 2013
- Uppsala (Sweden) September 2012
- Rotterdam (Netherlands) June 2012
- Montreal (Canada) April 2010, April 2011, October 2011
- Luxembourg September 2009
- Brussels (Belgium) March 2009
- Philadelphia (USA) November 2008
- Barcelona (Spain) May 2008
- San Diego (USA) October 2007
- Montreal (Canada) May 2007
- Salt Lake City, Utah (USA) October 2005
- Hinxton (UK) September 2005
- Helsinki (Finland) and Tallinn (Estonia) 2004
- Manchester (UK) 2003
- Montreal (Canada) July 2003

=== IPAC ===
The IPAC (International Policy interoperability and data Access Clearinghouse) resource both promotes the interoperability of international norms and facilitates the sharing of clinical and research data. Building on the expertise of P^{3}G, the IPAC offers a “one-stop” service for national and international collaborative research projects, along with normative tools and frameworks that respect the laws and regulations of each country while facilitating access. http://www.p3g.org/ipac

IPAC Researchers

Founded on the experience of the P^{3}G Research Platforms, the IPAC team includes the international expertise of ELSI (ethical/legal/social) research professionals.

Domains: Regenerative Medicine; Gene Therapy; Cancer; Paediatrics; Incompetent Adults; Deceased Persons; Rare Diseases; Bioethics/Law.

Issues: Biobanking; Consent; Access (Data/Samples); Commercialization; Confidentiality/Privacy; Research Ethics; Governance.

Proficiency in: English; French; Spanish; Arabic; Mandarin.

IPAC Services:

I. Data/Sample Collection - ELSI Interoperability

IPAC offers the following interoperability services:

- International comparative analysis of consents (legacy/prospective collections)
- Preparation of harmonized policies and consents for de novo projects
- Advice on changes to consents/re-contact/return of results
- Preparation of documents for IRB approvals including IP/publication policies
- Preparation of templates for MTA’s and for customized access agreements
- Validation of researcher (bona fides); institutional sign off; proposed data privacy security plans
- Ad hoc ethics consultation
- Preparation of international Codes of Conduct/Policies and Procedures
- Independent review of access requests, and,
- Ongoing monitoring and governance mechanisms

II. DACO - Review of Data and Samples Access Request/Authorization and Compliance

III. P^{3}G DataTrust

Due to concerns surrounding the return of clinically significant results to research participants in the context of translational projects, P^{3}G has developed the DataTrust (DT) service. This service supports the process of re-contacting participants and returning individual-level results in translational research projects, when appropriate. The DataTrust (DT) proposes to provide P^{3}G as an honest and independent, third party broker to act as the key holder of personal information and associated unique ID (codes). P^{3}G-DT safeguards the independence of the research project team, while enhancing ethical compliance with privacy and confidentiality standards in the research setting.

== Finance and History ==
P^{3}G was incorporated in 2004 under the leadership of Bartha Knoppers and Dr. Thomas Hudson, and was established by and for researchers working in the area of population genetics. P^{3}G is funded by Genome Quebec and Genome Canada, as well as other funding agencies.
