= Glossary of classical algebraic geometry =

The terminology of algebraic geometry changed drastically during the twentieth century, with the introduction of the general methods, initiated by David Hilbert and the Italian school of algebraic geometry in the beginning of the century, and later formalized by André Weil, Jean-Pierre Serre and Alexander Grothendieck. Much of the classical terminology, mainly based on case study, was simply abandoned, with the result that books and papers written before this time can be hard to read. This article lists some of this classical terminology, and describes some of the changes in conventions.

Dolgachev (2012) translates many of the classical terms in algebraic geometry into scheme-theoretic terminology. Other books defining some of the classical terminology include Baker (1922a, 1922b, 1923, 1925, 1933a, 1933b), Coolidge (1931), Coxeter (1969), Hudson (1990), Salmon (1879), Semple & Roth (1949).

== Conventions ==
On the other hand, while most of the material treated in the book exists in classical treatises in algebraic geometry, their somewhat archaic terminology and what is by now completely forgotten background knowledge makes these books useful to but a handful of experts in the classical literature.

— (Dolgachev 2012, p.iii–iv)

The change in terminology from around 1948 to 1960 is not the only difficulty in understanding classical algebraic geometry. There was also a lot of background knowledge and assumptions, much of which has now changed. This section lists some of these changes.

- In classical algebraic geometry, adjectives were often used as nouns: for example, "quartic" could also be short for "quartic curve" or "quartic surface".
- In classical algebraic geometry, all curves, surfaces, varieties, and so on came with fixed embeddings into projective space, whereas in scheme theory they are more often considered as abstract varieties. For example, a Veronese surface was not just a copy of the projective plane, but a copy of the projective plane together with an embedding into projective 5-space.
- Varieties were often considered only up to birational isomorphism, whereas in scheme theory they are usually considered up to biregular isomorphism. (Semple & Roth 1949, p.20–21)
- Until circa 1950, many of the proofs in classical algebraic geometry were incomplete (or occasionally just wrong). In particular authors often did not bother to check degenerate cases.
- Words (such as azygetic or bifid) were sometimes formed from Latin or Greek roots without further explanation, assuming that readers would use their classical education to figure out the meaning.

...we refer to a certain degree of informality of language, sacrificing precision to brevity, ..., and which has long characterized most geometrical writing. ...[The meaning] depends always on the context and is invariably assumed to be capable of unambiguous interpretation by the reader.

— (Semple & Roth 1949, p.iii)
- Definitions in classical algebraic geometry were often somewhat vague, and it is futile to try to find the precise meaning of some of the older terms because many of them never had a precise meaning. In practice this did not matter much when the terms were only used to describe particular examples, as in these cases their meaning was usually clear: for example, it was obvious what the 16 tropes of a Kummer surface were, even if "trope" was not precisely defined in general.
- Algebraic geometry was often implicitly done over the complex numbers (or sometimes the real numbers).
- Readers were often assumed to know classical (or synthetic) projective geometry, and in particular to have a thorough knowledge of conics, and authors would use terminology from this area without further explanation.
- Several terms, such as "Abelian group", "complete", "complex", "flat", "harmonic", "homology", "monoid", "normal", "pole", "regular", now have meanings that are unrelated to their original meanings. Other terms, such as "circle", have their meanings tacitly changed to work in complex projective space; for example, a circle in complex algebraic geometry is a conic passing through the circular points at infinity and has underlying topological space a 2-sphere rather than a 1-sphere.
- Sometimes capital letters are tacitly understood to stand for points, and small letters for lines or curves.

== Symbols ==
[1], [2], . . . , [n]
Projective space of dimension $1, 2, \ldots, n$. This notation was introduced by Schubert (1886).
∞¹, ∞², ...
A family of dimension 1, 2, ...
{1}, {2}, ...,{n}
A family or variety of dimension $1, 2, \ldots, n$. (Semple & Roth 1949, p.288)

== A ==
Abelian group
1. An archaic name for the symplectic group.
2. A commutative group.
aberrancy
The deviation of a curve from circular form. See Salmon (1879, p. 356).
absolute
1. A fixed choice of something in projective space, used to construct some other geometry from projective geometry. For example, choosing a plane, called the absolute plane, of projective space can be used to make its complement into a copy of affine space. Choosing a suitable conic or polarity, called the Cayley absolute, absolute conic or absolute polarity, in the absolute plane provides the means to put a metric on affine space so that it becomes a metric space.
2. Absolute geometry is roughly Euclidean geometry without the parallel postulate.
accidental
An accidental (or improper) double point of a surface in 4-dimensional projective space is a double point with two distinct tangent planes. (Baker 1933b, vol 6, p. 157)
acnode
An acnode is an isolated point of a real curve. See Salmon (1879, p.23).
adjoint
If C is a curve, an adjoint of C is a curve such that any point of C of multiplicity r has multiplicity at least r–1 on the adjoint. Sometimes the multiple points of C are required to be ordinary, and if theis condition is not satisfied the term "sub-adjoint" is used. (Semple & Roth 1949, p.55, 231)
affine
1. Affine space is roughly a vector space where one has forgotten which point is the origin.
2. An affine variety is a variety in affine space.
affinity
An automorphism of affine space.
aggregate
A set.
ambient
An ambient variety is a large variety containing all the points, curves, divisors, and so on that one is interested in.
anharmonic ratio
Cross-ratio
antipoint
One of a pair of points constructed from two foci of a curve. See Salmon (1879, p.119).
apparent
An apparent singularity is a singularity of a projection of a variety into a hyperplane. They are so called because they appear to be singularities to an observer at the point being projected from. (Semple & Roth 1949, p.55, 231)
apolar
Orthogonal under the polar pairing between the symmetric algebra of a vector space and its dual.
arithmetic genus
The arithmetic genus of a variety is a variation of the Euler characteristic of the trivial line bundle; see Hodge number.
Aronhold set
One of the 288 sets of 7 of the 28 bitangents of a quartic curve corresponding to the 7 odd theta characteristics of a normal set.
associated
1. An associated curve is the image of a projective curve in a Grassmannian, given by taking the tangent lines, or osculating planes, and so on.
axial
axis
A special line or linear subspace associated with some family of geometric objects. For example, a special linear complex in 4-dimensional space consists of all lines meeting a given plane, that is called the axial plane of the complex. (Semple & Roth 1949, p.274) Similar to directrix.
azygetic
Unpaired. Opposite of syzygetic, meaning paired. Example: azygetic triad, azygetic tetrad, azygetic set.

== B ==
base
1. A base point is a point common to all members of a family.
2. The base number ρ is the rank of the Neron–Severi group.
bicircular
Having nodes at the two circular points at infinity, as in bicircular curve. See Salmon (1879, p.231).
bicorn
A bicorn is a curve with two cusps.
bicuspidal
Having two cusps
bidegree
A pair of integers giving the degrees of a bihomogeneous polynomial in two sets of variables
bielliptic
1. A bielliptic curve is a branched double cover of an elliptic curve.
2. A bielliptic surface is the same as a hyperelliptic surface.
bifid
1. Split into two equal parts
2. A bifid map is an element of the vector space of dimension 2g over the field with 2 elements, consisting of the 2g+1-dimensional space of even-cardinality subsets of a set S of 2+2g elements, modulo the 1-dimensional space {0,S}. (Dolgachev 2012, p.215)
3. A bifid substitution is a permutation of the 28 bitangents of a quartic curve depending on one of the 35 decompositions of 8 symbols into two sets of 4 symbols. See Salmon (1879, p.223).
biflecnode
Same as fleflecnode. See Salmon (1879, p.210).
bigenus
The second plurigenus P_{2} of a surface.
bihomogeneous
Homogeneous in each of two sets of variables, as in bihomogeneous form.
binary
Depending on two variables, as in binary form
binodal
Having two nodes
binode
A double point of a surface whose tangent cone consists of two different planes. See unode. (Semple & Roth 1949, p.424)
bipartite
Having two connected components. See Salmon (1879, p.165).
bipunctual
1. Having two points
2. For a bipunctual conic with respect to 3 points see Baker (1922b, vol 2, p. 123).
birational
1. Two varieties are birational if they are isomorphic off lower-dimensional subsets
2. A birational map is a rational map with rational "inverse"
biregular
1. A biregular map is a regular map with regular inverse
2. Two varieties are biregular if there is a biregular map from one to the other, in other words if they are isomorphic as abstract varieties.
biscribed
Both circumscribed and inscribed, or in other words having vertices that lie on a curve and sides that are tangent to the curve, as in biscribed triangle. (Dolgachev 2012)
bitangent
A bitangent is a line that is tangent to a curve at two points. See Salmon (1879, p. 328).
bitangential
Meeting a curve at the tangency points of its bitangents
Brianchon hexagon
A non-planar hexagon whose three diagonals meet. (Baker 1922a, vol 1, p. 47)

== C ==
canonical
1. The canonical series is the linear series of the canonical line bundle
2. The canonical bundle is the line bundle of differential forms of highest degree.
3. The canonical map or canonical embedding is the map to the projective space of the sections of the canonical bundle
4. A canonical curve (or variety) is the image of a curve (or variety) under the canonical map
5. The canonical class is the divisor class of a canonical divisor
6. A canonical divisor is a divisor of a section of the canonical line bundle.
Canonizant
A canonizant is a covariant of forms.
catalecticant
A catalecticant is an invariant of a binary form of degree 2n that vanishes when the form is a sum of powers of n linear forms.
caustic
A caustic is the envelope of light rays from a point reflected in a curve
Cayley
Cayleyan
Named after Arthur Cayley
1. See Salmon (1879)
2. A Cayley octad is a set of 8 points in projective space given by the intersection of three quadrics. (Dolgachev 2012, 6.3.1)
3. The Cayley lines or Cayley–Salmon lines are the 20 lines passing through 3 Kirkman points.
4. A Cayley absolute is a conic or quadric used to define a metric.
center
centre
1. A special point associated with some geometric object
2. The center of a perspectivity
3. The center of an isologue
character
characteristic
1. An integer associated with a projective variety, such as its degree, rank, order, class, type. (Semple & Roth 1949, p.189) In particular the Plücker characteristics of a curve are the order, class, number of nodes, number of bitangents, number of cusps, and number of inflections. (Coolidge 1931, p.99)
2. A characteristic exponent is an exponent of a power series with non-negative coefficient, that is not divisible by the highest common factor of preceding exponents with non-zero coefficients. (Coolidge 1931, p.220)
3. The characteristic series of a linear system of divisors on a surface is the linear system of 0-cycles on one of the divisors given by its intersections with the other divisors.
chord
A line joining two points of a variety
chordal variety
A chordal variety is the union of the chords and tangent spaces of a projective variety
circle
A plane conic passing through the circular points at infinity. For real projective geometry this is much the same as a circle in the usual sense, but for complex projective geometry it is different: for example, circles have underlying topological spaces given by a 2-sphere rather than a 1-sphere.
circuit
A component of a real algebraic curve. A circuit is called even or odd depending on whether it has an even or odd number of intersections with a generic line. (Coolidge 1931, p. 50)
circular
1. A circular point is one of the two points at infinity (1: i: 0), (1: −i: 0) through which all circles pass
2. A circular algebraic curve is a curve passing through the two circular points at infinity. See also bicircular.
circumscribed
1. Having edges tangent to some curve, as in circumscribed quadrilateral.
2. Passing through the vertices of something, as in circumscribed circle.
cissoid
A cissoid is the curve generated from two curves and a point. See Salmon (1879).
class
1. The class of a plane curve is the number of proper tangents passing through a generic point of the plane. (Semple & Roth 1949, p.28)
2. The class of a space curve is the number of osculating planes passing through a generic point of space. (Semple & Roth 1949, p.85)
3. The class of a surface in rdimensional projective space is the number of tangent planes meeting a generic codimension 2 subspace in a line. (Semple & Roth 1949, p.28)
4. The degree of a contravariant or concomitant in the covariant variables.
coaxal
coaxial
A pencil of circles is called coaxal if their centers all lie on a line (called the axis).
A family of plane circles all passing through the same two points (other than the circular points at infinity). (Baker 1922b, vol 2, p. 66)
coincidence
1. A coincidence quadric is a quadric associated to a correlation, given by the locus of points lying in the corresponding hyperplane. (Semple & Roth 1949, p.8)
2. A fixed point of a correspondence, in other words a point of a variety corresponding to itself under a correspondence. (Coolidge 1931, p. 126)
collinear
On the same line
collineation
A collineation is an isomorphism from one projective space to another, often to itself. (Semple & Roth 1949, p.6) See correlation.
complete
1. A linear series of divisors is called complete if it is not contained in a larger linear series.(Semple & Roth 1949, p.351)
2. A scheme is called complete if the map to a point is proper
3. A complete quadrangle is 4 points and the 6 lines joining pairs
4. A complete quadrilateral is 4 lines meeting in pairs in 6 points
5. A complete conic in the plane is a (possibly degenerate) conic, together with a pair of (possibly equal) points on it if it is a double line
complex
1. (Noun.) A line complex, a family of lines of codimension 1 in the family of all lines in some projective space, in particular a 3-dimensional family of lines in 3-dimensional projective space. (Semple & Roth 1949, p.236) See congruence.
2. (Adjective.) Related to the complex numbers.
3. The (line) complex group is an old name for the symplectic group.
composite
Reducible (meaning having more than one irreducible component).
conchoid
A conchoid is the curve given by the cissoid of a circle and another curve. See Salmon (1879).
concomitant
A (mixed) concomitant is an invariant homogeneous polynomial in the coefficients of a form, a covariant variable, and a contravariant variable. In other words it is a (tri)homogeneous polynomial on SV⊕V⊕V* for some vector space V, where SV is some symmetric power of V and V* its dual, that is invariant under the special linear group of V. In practice V often has dimension 2. The degree, class, and order of a concomitant are its degrees in the three types of variable. Concomitants are generalizations of covariants, contravariants, and invariants.
concurrent
Meeting at a point
cone
1. The union of the lines joining an algebraic set with a linear algebraic set. Called a point-cone, line-cone, ... if the linear set is a point, line, ...(Semple & Roth 1949, p.18)
2. A subset of a vector space closed under multiplication by scalars.
configuration
A configuration is a finite set of points and lines (and sometimes planes), generally with equal numbers of points per line and equal numbers of lines per point.
confocal
Having the same foci
congruence
A family of lines in projective space such that there are a nonzero finite number of lines through a generic point (Semple & Roth 1949, p.238, 288). See complex.
conic
A conic is a degree 2 curve. Short for "conic section", the intersection of a cone with a plane.
conjugate
1. A conjugate point is an acnode. (Salmon 1879, p.23)
2. A conjugate point is a point lying on the hyperplane corresponding to another point under a polarity.
3. A conjugate line is a line containing the point corresponding to another line under a polarity (or plane conic). (Baker 1922b, vol 2, p. 26)
4. For harmonic conjugate see harmonic.
connex
A correspondence between a projective space and its dual.
consecutive
Infinitesimally near. For example, a tangent line to a curve is a line through two consecutive points of the curve, and a focal point is the intersection of the normals of two consecutive points.
contravariant
1. A bihomogeneous polynomial in dual variables of x, y, ... and the coefficients of some homogeneous form in x, y,... that is invariant under some group of linear transformations. In other words it is a bihomogeneous polynomial on SV⊕V for some vector space V, where SV is some symmetric power of V and V* its dual, that is invariant under the special linear group of V. In practice V often has dimension at least 3, because when it has dimension 2 these are more or less the same as covariants. The degree and class of a contravariant are its degrees in the two types of variable. Contravariants generalize invariants and are special cases of concomitants, and are in some sense dual to covariants.
coplanar
In the same plane
correlation
An isomorphism from a projective space to the dual of a projective space, often to the dual of itself. A correlation on the projective space of a vector space is essentially the same as a nonsingular bilinear form on the vector space, up to multiplication by constants. (Semple & Roth 1949, p.7)
coresidual
See Salmon (1879, p.131)
correspondence
A correspondence from X to Y is an algebraic subset of X×Y
cosingular
Having the same singularities
couple
An ordered pair
covariant
1. A bihomogeneous polynomial in x, y, ... and the coefficients of some homogeneous form in x, y,... that is invariant under some group of linear transformations. In other words it is a bihomogeneous polynomial on SV⊕V* for some vector space V, where SV is some symmetric power of V and V* its dual, that is invariant under the special linear group of V. In practice V often has dimension 2. The degree and order of a covariant are its degrees in the two types of variable. Covariants generalize invariants and are special cases of concomitants, and are in some sense dual to contravariants
2. The variety defined by a covariant. In particular the curve defined by the Hessian or Steinerian covariants of a curve are called covariant curves. (Coolidge 1931, p.151)
Cremona transformation
A Cremona transformation is a birational map from a projective space to itself
cross-ratio
The cross-ratio is an invariant of 4 points on a projective line.
crunode
Crunode is an archaic term for a node, a double point with distinct tangent directions.
cubic
Degree 3, especially a degree 3 projective variety
cubo-cubic
A cubo-cubic transformation is a Cremona transformation such that the homaloids of the transformation and its inverse all have degree 3. Semple & Roth (1949, p.179)
curve
A curve together with an embedding into projective space.
cusp
A cusp is a singular point of a curve whose tangent cone is a line.
cuspidal edge
The locus of the focal points of a family of planes (Semple & Roth 1949, p.85, 87)
cyclide
A cyclide is a quartic surface passing doubly through the absolute conic. (Semple & Roth 1949, p.141)

== D ==
decic
decimic
1. (Adjective) Degree 10
2. (Noun) A degree 10 projective variety
deficiency
1. The deficiency of a linear system is its codimension in the corresponding complete linear system.
2. The deficiency D of a plane curve is an approximation to its genus, equal to the genus when all singular points are ordinary, given by (n–1)(n–2)/2 –(a–1)(a–2)/2 – (b–1)(b–2)/2 –..., where n is the degree of the curve and a. b, ... are the multiplicities of its singular points. (Semple & Roth 1949, p.30), (Salmon 1879, p. 28)
degree
1. The number of intersection points of a projective variety with a generic linear subspace of complementary dimension
2. The number of points of a divisor on a curve
Desargues
The Desargues figure or configuration is a configuration of 10 lines and 10 points in Desargues' theorem.
desmic system
A desmic system is a configuration of three desmic tetrahedra.
developable
1. (Noun) A 1-dimensional family of planes in 3-dimensional projective space (Semple & Roth 1949, p.85).
2. (Noun) The envelope of the normals of a curve
3. (Noun) Short for a developable surface, one that can be unrolled to a plane
4. The tangent developable of a curve is the surface consisting of its tangent lines.
5. Flat, as in developable surface
differential
1. A differential of the first kind is a holomorphic 1-form.
2. A differential of the second kind is a meromorphic 1-form such that the residues of all poles are 0. Sometimes it is only allowed to have one pole that must be of order 2.
3. A differential of the third kind is sometimes a meromorphic 1-form such that all poles are simple (order 1). Sometimes it is only allowed to have 2 poles.
director
The director circle of a conic is the locus of points where two orthogonal tangent lines to the conic meet. More generally the director conic of a conic in regard to two points is defined in a similar way. (Baker 1922b, vol 2, p. 26)
directrix
A straight line, or more generally a projective space, associated with some geometric configuration, such as the directrix of a conic section or the directrix of a rational normal scroll
discriminant
The invariant (on the vector space of forms of degree d in n variables) which vanishes exactly when the corresponding hypersurface in P^{n-1} is singular.
double curve
A 1-dimensional singularity, usually of a surface, of multiplicity 2
double point
1. A 0-dimensional singularity of multiplicity 2, such as a node.
One of the two points fixed by an involution of a projective line. (Baker 1922b, vol 2, p.3)
double six
The Schläfli double six configuration
duad
A set of two points
dual
1. The dual of a projective space is the set of hyperplanes, considered as another projective space.
2. The dual curve of a plane curve is the set of its tangent lines, considered as a curve in the dual projective plane.
3. A dual number is a number of the form a+εb where ε has square 0. Semple & Roth (1949, p.268)

== E ==
env
Eckardt point
An Eckardt point is a point of intersection of 3 lines on a cubic surface.
effective
An effective cycle or divisor is one with no negative coefficients
elation
A collineation that fixes all points on a line (called its axis) and all lines though a point on the axis (called its center).
eleven-point conic
The eleven-point conic is a conic containing 11 special points associated to four points and a line. (Baker 1922b, vol 2, p. 49)
embedded
An embedded variety is one contained in a larger variety, sometimes called the ambient variety.
enneaedro
A set of 9 tritangent planes to a cubic surface containing the 27 lines.
envelope
A curve tangent to a family of curves. See Salmon (1879, p. 65).
epitrochoid
An epitrochoid is the curve traced by a point of a disc rolling along another disc. Salmon (1879)
equiaffine
equiaffinity
An equiaffinity is an equiaffine transformation, meaning an affine transformation preserving area.
equianharmonic
1. Four points whose cross ratio (or anharmonic ratio) is a cube root of 1
2. An equianharmonic cubic is a cubic curve with j-invariant 0
equivalence
In intersection theory, a positive-dimensional variety sometimes behaves formally as if it were a finite number of points; this number is called its equivalence.
evectant
A contravariant defined by Sylvester depending on an invariant. See Salmon (1879, p. 184).
evolute
An evolute is the envelope of the normal lines of a plane curve. See Salmon (1879, p. 40).
exceptional
1. Corresponding to something of lower dimension under a birational correspondence, as in exceptional curve, exceptional divisor
2. An exceptional curve on a surface is one that corresponds to a simple point on another surface under a birational correspondence. It is called an exceptional curve of the first kind if it is transformed into a point of the other surface, and an exceptional curve of the second kind if it is transformed into a curve of the other surface.

== F ==
facultative
A facultative point is one where a given function is positive. (Salmon 1885, p.243)
first kind
holomorphic or regular (when applied to differentials)
flat
1. (Noun) A linear subspace of projective space, such as a point, line, plane, hyperplane.
2. (Adjective) Having curvature zero.
3. (Adjective) For the term "flat" in scheme theory see flat module, flat morphism.
flecnode
A double point that is also a point of inflexion of one branch. (Cayley 1852). (Salmon 1879, p.210)
fleflecnode
A double point that is also a point of inflexion of both branches. (Cayley 1852).
flex
Short for point of inflection
focal
1. A focal point, line, plane, ... is the intersection of several consecutive elements of a family of linear subspaces. (Semple & Roth 1949, p. 85, 252)
2. A focal curve, surface and so on is the locus of the focal points of a family of linear subspaces. (Semple & Roth 1949, p.252)
focus
A focal point. See Salmon (1879, p. 116), (Semple & Roth 1949, p. 85,251)
foliate singularity
See (Semple & Roth 1949, p.422)
form
1. A homogeneous polynomial in several variables. Same as quantic.
2. A differential form.
free intersection
An intersection point of two members of a family that is not a base point.
freedom
Dimension, as in degrees of freedom. (Semple & Roth 1949, p.26).
fundamental
This term seem to be ambiguous and poorly defined: Zariski states: "I can find no clear-cut definition of a fundamental curve in the literature".
1. The fundamental set or fundamental locus of a birational correspondence appears to mean (roughly) either the set of points where it is not a bijection or the set of points where it is not defined.
2. A fundamental point, curve, or variety is a point, curve, or variety in the fundamental set of a birational correspondence.

== G ==
g^{r}_{d}, γ^{r}_{d}
A linear or algebraic system of divisors of dimension r and degree d on a curve. The letter g is used for linear systems, and the letter γ is used for algebraic systems.
generator
One of the lines of a ruled surface (Semple & Roth 1949, p.204) or more generally an element of some family of linear spaces.

Most particularly we refer to the recurrent use of such adjectives as `general' or `generic', or such phrases as `in general', whose meaning, wherever they are used, depends always on the context and is invariably assumed to be capable of unambiguous interpretation by the reader.

— (Semple & Roth 1949, p.iii)
generic
1. Not having some special properties, which are usually not stated explicitly.
2. A generic point is one having coordinates that are algebraically independent over the base field.
3. The generic point of a scheme.
genus
1. The dimension of the space of sections of the canonical bundle, as in the genus of a curve or the geometric genus of a surface
2. arithmetic genus of a surface
3. plurigenus
geometric genus
The geometric genus is the dimension of the space of holomorphic n-forms on an n-dimensional non-singular projective variety.
grade
The grade of a linear system of divisors on an n-dimensional variety is the number of free intersection points of n generic divisors. In particular the grade of a linear series of divisors on a curve is now called the degree and is the number of points in each divisor (Semple & Roth 1949, p.345), and the grade of a net of curves on a surface is the number of free intersections of two generic curves. (Semple & Roth 1949, p.45) (Semple & Roth 1949, p.159)
Grassmannian
A Grassmannian is a variety parameterizing linear subspaces of projective space
group
1. A group or point-group is an archaic term for an effective divisor on a curve. This usage is particularly confusing, because some such divisors are called normal, with the result that there are "normal sub-groups" having nothing to do with the normal subgroups of group theory. (Coolidge 1931)
2. A group in the usual sense.

== H ==
harmonic
1. Two pairs of points on a line are harmonic if their cross ratio is –1. The 4 points are called a harmonic set, and the points of one pair are called harmonic conjugates with respect to the other pair.
2. A harmonic cubic is an elliptic curve with j-invariant 1728, given by a double cover of the projective line branched at 4 points with cross ratio –1.
3. Satisfying some analogue of the Laplace equation, as in harmonic form.
4. The harmonic polar line of an inflection point of a cubic curve is the component of the polar conic other than the tangent line. (Dolgachev 2012, 3.1.2)
5. A harmonic net is a set of points on a line containing the harmonic conjugate of any point with respect to any other two points. (Baker 1922a, vol 1, p. 133)
6. For harmonically conjugate conics see (Baker 1922b, vol 2, p. 122).
Hesse
Hessian
Named after Otto Hesse.
1. A Hessian matrix, or a variety associated with it. See Salmon (1879, p.55).
2. The Hessian line is a line associated to 3 points A, B, C, of a conic, containing the three points given by the intersections of the tangents at A, B, C with the lines BC, CA, AB.
3. The Hessian point is a point associated to three lines tangent to a conic, whose construction is dual to that of a Hessian line.
4. The Hessian pair or Hessian duad of three points on a projective line is the pair of points fixed by the projective transformations of order 3 permuting the 3 points. More generally the Hessian pair is also defined in a similar way for triples of points of a rational curve, or triples of elements of a pencil.
5. The Hesse configuration is the configuration of inflection points of a plane cubic.
6. The Hesse group is the group of automorphisms of the Hesse configuration, of order 216.
hexad
A set of 6 points
homaloid
An element of a homaloidal system, in particular the image of a hyperlpane under a Cremona transformation.
homaloidal
1. A homaloidal linear system of divisors is a linear system of grade 1, such as the image of the linear system of hyperplanes of projective space under a Cremona transformation. (Semple & Roth 1949, p.45) (Coolidge 1931, p. 442) When the linear system has dimension 2 or 3 it is called a homaloidal net or homaloidal web.
2. Homaloidal means similar to a flat plane.
homographic
1. Having the same invariants. See Salmon (1879, p.232).
2. A homographic transformation is an automorphism of projective space over a field, in other words an element of the projective general linear group. (Salmon 1879, p.283)
homography
1. An isomorphism between projective spaces induced by an isomorphism of vector spaces.
2. An axis of homography is a line associated to two related ranges of a conic. (Baker 1922b, vol 2, p. 16)
homology
1. As in homology group
2. A collineation fixing all lines through a point (the center) and all points through a line (the axis) not containing the center. See elation. This terminology was introduced by Lie.
3. An automorphism of projective space with a hyperplane of fixed points (called the axis). It is called a harmonic homology if it has order 2, in which case it has an isolated fixed point called its center.
Hurwitz curve
Hurwitz surface
A Hurwitz curve is a complex algebraic curve of genus g>0 with the maximum possible number 84(g–1) of automorphisms.
hyperbolism
Essentially a blow-up of a curve at a point. See Salmon (1879, p.175).
hypercusp
A singularity of a curve of some multiplicity r whose tangent cone is a single line meeting the curve with order r+1. (Coolidge 1931, p. 18)
hyperelliptic
A hyperelliptic curve is a curve with a degree 2 map to the projective line.
hyperflex
Same as point of undulation: a point of a curve where the tangent line has contact of order at least 4.
hyperosculating point
A point where the tangent space meets with order higher than normal.
hyperplane
A linear subspace of projective space of codimension 1. Same as prime.

== I ==
index of speciality
The dimension of the first cohomology group of the line bundle of a divisor D; often denoted by i or i(D). Semple & Roth (1949, p.381)
infinitely near point
A point on a blow up of a variety
inflection
inflexion
An inflection is a point where the curvature vanishes, or in other words where the tangent line meets with order at least 3. Differential geometry uses the slightly stricter condition that the curvature changes sign at the point. See Salmon (1879, p. 32)
inpolar quadric
See (Baker 1923, vol 3, p. 52, 88)
inscribed
1. Having vertices on a curve, as in inscribed figure.
2. Tangent to some lines, as in inscribed circle.
integral
An integral is (more or less) what is now called a closed differential form, or sometimes the result of integrating such a form..
1. An integral of the first kind is a holomorphic closed differential form.
2. An integral of the second kind is a meromorphic closed differential form with no residues.
3. An integral of the third kind is a meromorphic closed differential form whose poles are all simple.
4. A simple integral is a closed 1-form, or the result of integrating a 1-form.
5. A double integral is a closed 2-form, or the result of integrating a 2-form.
invariant
(Noun) A polynomial in the coefficients of a homogeneous form, invariant under some group of linear transformations. See also covariant, contravariant, concomitant.
inversion
An inversion is a transformation of order 2 exchanging the inside and outside of a circle. See Salmon (1879, p.103).
involute
An involute is a curve obtained by unrolling a string around a curve. See Salmon (1879, p. 278).
involution
1. A transformation whose square is the identity. Cremona transformations that are involutions include Bertini involutions, Geiser involutions, and De Jonquières involutions.
irregularity
The irregularity of a surface is the dimension of the space of holomorphic 1-forms on a non-singular projective surface; see Hodge number.
isologue
Given a Cremoma transformation T, the isologue of a point p is the set of points x such that p, x, T(x) are collinear. The point p is called the center of the isologue.

== J ==
Jacobian
1. The Jacobian variety of a curve
2. A Jacobian curve; see below
Jacobian curve
The locus of double points of curves of a net. (Semple & Roth 1949, p.115)
Jacobian set
The set of free double points of a pencil of curves. (Semple & Roth 1949, p.119)
Jacobian system
The linear system generated by Jacobian curves. (Semple & Roth 1949, p.117)
join
The join of two linear spaces is the smallest linear space containing both of them.

== K ==
kenotheme
An intersection of n hypersurfaces in n-dimensional projective space. (Sylvester 1853, Glossary p. 543–548) Archaic.
keratoid
Horn-like. A keratoid cusp is one whose two branches curve in opposite direction; see ramphoid cusp. Salmon (1879)
Kirkman point
One of the 60 points lying on 3 of the Plücker lines associated with 6 points on a conic.
Klein
1. Felix Klein
2. The Klein icosahedral surface is a certain cubic surface
3. The Klein quartic is the curve $x^3y + y^3z + z^3x = 0.$
Kronecker index
The intersection number of two curves on a surface
Kummer surface
A quartic surface with 16 nodes

== L ==
Laguerre net
A net V of plane curves of some degree d such that the base locus of a generic pencil of V is the base locus of V together with d–1 collinear points (Dolgachev 2012, theorem 7.3.5) (Coolidge 1931, p. 423)
lemniscate
A lemniscate is a curve resembling a figure 8. See Salmon (1879, p.42)
limaçon
A limaçon is a curve traced by a point on a circle rolling around a similar circle. See Salmon (1879, p.43)
line
A line in projective space; in other words a subvariety of degree 1 and dimension 1.
line coordinates
Projective coordinates. See Salmon (1879, p. 7)
linear
Degree 1
linear system
A linear system of divisors, given by the zeros of elements of a vector space of sections of a line bundle
locus
1-A subset of projective space given by points satisfying some condition

== M ==
manifold
An algebraic manifold is a cycle of projective space, in other words a formal linear combination of irreducible subvarieties. Algebraic manifolds may have singularities, so their underlying topological spaces need not be manifolds in the sense of differential topology. Semple & Roth (1949, p.14–15)
meet
The meet of two sets is their intersection.
Möbius tetrads
Two tetrads such that the plane containing any three points of one tetrad contains a point of the other. (Baker 1922a, vol 1, p. 62)
model
1. A variety whose points (or sometimes hyperplane sections) correspond to elements of some family. Similar to what is now called a parameter space or moduli space.
2. A model for a field extension K of a field k is a projective variety over k together with an isomorphism between K and its field of rational functions.
modulus
A function of algebraic varieties depending only on the isomorphism type; in other words, a function on a moduli space
Moebius tetrads
See Möbius tetrads
monoid
A surface of degree n with a point of multiplicity n–1. (Semple & Roth 1949, p.187)
monoidal transformation
A Cremona transformation of projective space generated by a family of monoids with the same point of multiplicity n–1. More generally a blow-up along a subvariety, called the center of the monoidal transformation. (Semple & Roth 1949, p.187)
multiple
A multiple point is a singular point (one with a non-regular local ring).
multiplicity
The multiplicity of a point on a hypersurface is the degree of the first non-vanishing coefficient of the Taylor series at the point. More generally one can define the multiplicity of any point of a variety as the multiplicity of its local ring. A point has multiplicity 1 if and only if it is non-singular.

== N ==
Néron–Severi group
The Néron–Severi group is the group of divisors module numerical equivalence.
nest
Two components (circuits) of a real algebraic curve are said to nest if one is inside the other. (Coolidge 1931)
net
1. A 2-dimensional linear system. See "pencil" and "web". See also Laguerre net.
2. A harmonic net is a set of points on a line containing the harmonic conjugate of any point with respect to any other two points. (Baker 1922a, vol 1, p. 133)
Newton polygon
The convex hull of the points with coordinates given by the exponents of the terms of a polynomial.
nodal
A nodal tangent to a singular point of a curve is one of the lines of its tangent cone. (Semple & Roth 1949, p.26)
node
A singular point p of a hypersurface f = 0, usually with the determinant of the Hessian of f not zero at p. (Cayley 1852)
node cusp
A singularity of a curve where a node and a cusp coincide at the same point. (Salmon 1879, p. 207)
normal
1. A subvariety of projective space is linearly normal if the linear system defining the embedding is complete; see rational normal curve.
2. Orthogonal to the tangent space, such as a line orthogonal to the tangent space or the normal bundle.
3. A normal intersection is an intersection with the "expected" codimension (given a sum of codimensions). (Semple & Roth 1949, p.16)
4. Local rings are integrally closed; see normal scheme.
null-polarity
A correlation given by a skew symmetric matrix. A null-polarity of the projective space of a vector space is essentially a non-degenerate skew-symmetric bilinear form, up to multiplication by scalars. See also polarity. (Semple & Roth 1949, p.9)

== O ==
octad
A set of 8 points
octic
1. (Adjective) Degree 8
2. (Noun) A degree 8 projective variety
ombilic
The curve at infinity which is the intersection of any sphere with the plane at infinity. All points of the ombilic are non-real.
order
1. Now called degree of an algebraic variety: the number of intersection points with a generic linear subspace of complementary dimension. (Semple & Roth 1949, p.15)
2. The order of a covariant or concomitant: its degree in the contravariant variables.
3. The order of a Cremona transformation is the order (degree) of its homaloids. (Semple & Roth 1949, p.46)
ordinary
An ordinary point of multiplicity m of a curve is one with m distinct tangent lines.
oscnode
A double point of a plane curve that is also a point of osculation; in other words the two branches meet to order at least 3. (Cayley 1852)
osculate
Kiss; to meet with high order. See Salmon (1879, p. 356).
osculating plane
A tangent plane of a space curve having third order contact with it.
outpolar quadric
See (Baker 1922b, vol 2, p. 33) and (Baker 1923, vol 3, p. 52)

== P ==
Pappus
1. Pappus of Alexandria.
2. The Pappus configuration is the configuration of 9 lines and 9 points that occurs in Pappus's hexagon theorem.
parabolic point
A point of a variety that also lies in the Hessian.
parallel
1. Meeting at the line or plane at infinity, as in parallel lines
2. A parallel curve is the envelope of a circle of fixed radius moving along another curve. (Coolidge 1931, p.192)
partitivity
The number of connected components of a real algebraic curve. See Salmon (1879, p.165).
Pascal
Short for Pascal line, the line determined by 6 points of a conic in Pascal's theorem
pedal
The pedal curve of C with respect to a pedal point P is the locus of points X such that the line through X orthogonal to PX is tangent to C. (Salmon 1879, p.96)
pencil
A 1-dimensional linear system. See pencil (mathematics) and Lefschetz pencil.
pentad
A set of 5 points
pentahedron
A union of 5 planes, in particular the Sylvester pentahedron of a cubic surface.
period
The integral of a differential form over a submanifold
perspectivity
An isomorphism between two projective lines (or ranges) of projective space such that the lines joining each point of one line to the corresponding point of the other line all pass through a fixed point, called the center of the perspectivity or the perspector.
perspector
The center of a perspectivity
perspectrix
The line in Desargues theorem on which the intersections of pairs of sides of two perspective triangles lie
pinch
A pinch point is a singular point of a surface, where the two tangent planes of a point on a double curve coincide in a double plane, called the pinch plane. (Semple & Roth 1949, p.175)
pippian
Introduced by Cayley (1857). Now called the Cayleyan. See also quippian.
Plücker
1. For Plücker characteristic see characteristic
2. A Plücker line is one of the 15 lines containing 4 of the 20 Steiner points associated to 6 points on a conic. The Plücker lines meet in threes at the 60 Kirkman points. (Dolgachev 2012, p.124)
plurigenus
Plural plurigenera
The dth plurigenus of a variety is the dimension of the space of sections of the dth power of the canonical line bundle.
point-star
A family of lines with a common point
polar
1. (Adjective) Related by a polarity
2. The polar conic is the zero set of the quadratic form associated to a polarity, or equivalently the set of self-conjugate points of the polarity.
3. (Noun) The first polar, second polar, and so on are varieties of degrees n–1, n–2, ... formed from a point and a hypersurface of degree n by polarizing the equation of the hypersurface. (Semple & Roth 1949, p.11)
4. A polar or polar line is the line corresponding to a point under a polarity of the projective plane.
polarity
A correlation given by a symmetrical matrix, or a correlation of period 2. A polarity of the projective space of a vector space is essentially a non-degenerate symmetric bilinear form, up to multiplication by scalars. See also null-polarity. (Semple & Roth 1949, p.9)
pole
1. The point corresponding to a hyperplane under a polarity.
2. A singularity of a rational function.
poloconic
polocubic
poloquartic
The poloconic (also called conic polar) of a line in the plane with respect to a cubic curve is the locus of points whose first polar is tangent to the line. (Dolgachev 2012, p. 156–157)
polygonal
A polygonal (or k-gonal) curve is a curve together with a map (of degree k) to the projective line. The degree of the map is called the gonality of the curve. When the degree is 1, 2, or 3 the curve is called rational, hyperelliptic, or trigonal.
porism
1. A porism is a corollary, especially in geometry, as in Poncelet's porism. The precise meaning seems to be controversial.
2. An arrangement of geometrical figures (such as lines or circles) that are inscribed in one curve and circumscribed around another, as in Poncelet's porism or Steiner's porism. There seems to be some confusion about whether "porism" refers to the geometrical configuration or to the statement of the result.
poristic
Having either no solutions or infinitely many (Semple & Roth 1949, p.186). For example, Poncelet's porism and Steiner's porism imply that if there is one way to arrange lines or circles then there are infinitely many ways.
postulated
A postulated object (point, line, and so on) is an object in some larger space. For example, a point at infinity of projective space is a postulated point of affine space. (Baker 1922a, vol 1,)
postulation
The postulation of a variety for some family is the number of independent conditions needed to force an elements of the family to contain the variety. (Semple & Roth 1949, p.440)
power of a point
Laguerre defined the power of a point with respect to an algebraic curve of degree n to be the product of the distances from the point to the intersections with a circle through it, divided by the nth power of the diameter. He showed that this is independent of the choice of circle through the point. (Coolidge 1931, p.176)
prime
An old term for a hyperplane in a projective space. (Semple & Roth 1949, p.1)
primal
An old term for a projective hypersurface. (Semple & Roth 1949, p.10)
projectivity
An isomorphism between two projective lines (or ranges). A projectivity is a product of at most three perspectivities.
propinquity
A number depending on two branches at a point, defined by Coolidge (1931, p. 224).
proximate
For proximate points see (Zariski 1935, p.9).
pure
All components are of the same dimension. Now called equidimensional. (Semple & Roth 1949, p.15)

== Q ==
quadratic transformation
1. A Cremona transformation of degree 2. A standard quadratic transformation is one similar to the map taking each coordinate to its inverse.
2. A monomial transformation with center a point, or in other words a blowup at a point.
quadric
Degree 2, especially a degree 2 projective variety. Not to be confused with quantic or quartic.
quadrisecant
A quadrisecant is a line meeting something in four points
quadro-cubic, quadro-quartic
A quadro-cubic or quadro-quartic transformation is a Cremona transformation such that the homaloids of the transformation have degree 2 and those of its inverse have degree 3 or 4. (Semple & Roth 1949, p.180, 188)
quantic
A homogeneous polynomial in several variables, now usually called a form. Not to be confused with quartic or quadric.
quarto-quartic
A Quarto-quartic transformation is a Cremona transformation such that the homaloids of the transformation and its inverse all have degree 4. (Semple & Roth 1949, p.187)
quaternary
Depending on four variables, as in quaternary form.
quartic
Degree 4, especially a degree 4 projective variety. Not to be confused with quantic or quadric.
quintic
Degree 5, especially a degree 5 projective variety.
quippian
A quippian is a degree 5 class 3 contravariant of a plane cubic introduced by Cayley (1857) and discussed by Dolgachev (2012, p.157). See also pippian.
quotient ring
The quotient ring of a point (or more generally a subvariety) is what is now called its local ring, formed by adding inverses to all functions that do not vanish identically on it.

== R ==
ramphoid
Beak-like. A ramphoid cusp is one whose two branches curve in the same direction; see keratoid cusp.
Salmon (1879, p.46)
rank
1. The rank of a projective curve is the number of tangents to the curve meeting a generic linear subspace of codimension 2. (Semple & Roth 1949, p.84)
2. The rank of a projective surface is the rank of a curve given by the intersection of the surface with a generic hyperplane. (Semple & Roth 1949, p.193) See order, class, type.
range
1. The set of all points on a line. (Coxeter 1969, p.242)
2. A labeled or finite ordered set of points on a line.
rational
1. Birational to projective space.
2. Defined over the rational numbers.
ray
A line, especially one in a family of lines
regular
1. A regular surface is one whose irregularity is zero.
2. Having no singularities; see regular local ring.
3. Symmetrical, as in regular polygon, regular polyhedron.
4. Defined everywhere, as in regular (birational) map.
regulus
One of the two pencils of lines on a product of two projective planes or a quadric surface.
related
Two ranges (labeled sets) of points on a line are called related if there is a projectivity taking one range to the other.
representative manifold
A parameter space or moduli space for some family of varieties
residual
The residual intersection of two varieties consists of the "non-obvious" part of their intersection.
resultant
1. The resultant of two polynomials, given by the determinant of the Sylvester matrix of two binary forms, that vanishes if they have a common root.
2. A Cremona transformation formed from n correlations of n-dimensional projective space. (Semple & Roth 1949, p.180)
reverse
Inverse (of a function or birational map)
ruled
Covered by lines, as in ruled surface. See also scroll.

== S ==
S_{n}
Projective space of dimension n.
Salmon conic
The Salmon conic of a pair of plane conics is the locus of points such that the pairs of tangents to the two conics are harmonically conjugate. (Dolgachev 2012, p. 119)
satellite
1. If a line meets a cubic curve in 3 points, the residual intersections of the tangents of these points with the cubic all lie on a line, called the satellite line of the original line. See Salmon (1879, p. 127).
2. A certain plane curve of degree (n–1)(n–2) constructed from a plane curve of degree n and a generic point. (Coolidge 1931, p. 159–161)
3. For satellite points see (Zariski 1935, p.8). Possibly something to do with base points.
scroll
A ruled surface with an embedding into projective space so that the lines of the ruled surface are also lines of projective space.
secant
1. A line intersecting a variety in 2 points, or more generally an n-dimensional projective space meeting a variety in n+1 points.
2. A secant variety is the union of the secants of a variety.
second kind
All residues at poles are zero
secundum
An intersection of two primes (hyperplanes) in projective space. (Semple & Roth 1949, p.2)
Segre
1. Named after either Beniamino Segre or Corrado Segre
2. A Segre variety or Segre embedding is the product of two projective spaces, or an embedding of this into a larger projective space.
3. The Segre cubic is a cubic hypersurface in 4-dimensional projective space.
self-conjugate
self-polar
1. Incident with its image under a polarity. In particular the self-conjugate points of a polarity form the polar conic.
2. A self-conjugate (or self-polar) triangle (or triad) is a triangle such that each vertex corresponds to the opposite edge under a polarity.
3. A self-conjugate tetrad is a set of 4 points such that the pole of each side lies on the opposite side. (Dolgachev 2012, p.123)
septic
septimic
1. (Adjective) Degree 7
2. (Noun) A degree 7 projective variety
3. (Noun) A degree 7 form
sextactic point
One of the 27 points of an elliptic curve of order dividing 6 but not 3. (Salmon 1879, p.132)
sextic
Degree 6, especially a degree 6 projective variety
simple
A simple point of a variety is a non-singular point. More generally a simple subvariety W of a variety V is one with a regular local ring, which means roughly that most points of W are simple points of V.
singular
Special in some way, including but not limited to the current sense of having a singularity
skew
Intersecting in a set that is either empty or of the "expected" dimension. For example skew lines in projective 3-space do not intersect, while skew planes in projective 4-space intersect in a point.
solid
A 3-dimensional linear subspace of projective space, or in other words the 3-dimensional analogue of a point, line, or plane. (Semple & Roth 1949, p.4)
special divisor
An effective divisor whose first cohomology group (of the associated invertible sheaf) is non-zero.
spinode
A cusp. (Cayley 1852), Salmon (1879, p.23)
star
A collection of lines (and sometimes planes and so on) with a common point, called the center of the star. (Baker 1922a, vol 1, p. 109)
stationary point
A cusp. See Salmon (1879, p.23).
Steiner
Steinerian
1. Named after Jakob Steiner
2. A Steinerian is the locus of the singular points of the polar quadrics of a hypersurface. Salmon (1879)
3. A Steiner surface is a certain embedding of the projective plane into projective 3-space.
4. a Steiner point is one of the 20 points lying on 3 of the Pascal lines associated with 6 points on a conic.
Steiner–Hessian
One of Cayley's names for the Cayleyan. See Salmon (1879, p. 352).
surface
An abstract surface together with an embedding into projective space.
superabundance of a divisor on a surface.
The dimension of the first cohomology group of the corresponding sheaf.
symmetroid
The zeros of the determinant of a symmetric matrix of linear forms
syntheme
A partition of a set of 6 elements into 3 pairs, or an element of the symmetric group on 6 points of cycle shape 222. (Dolgachev 2012)
system
A family of algebraic sets in projective space; for example, a line system is a family of lines.
syzygetic
Paired. Opposite of azygetic, meaning unpaired. Example: syzygetic triad, syzygetic tetrad, syzygetic set, syzygetic pencil.
syzygy
1. A point is in syzygy with some other points if it is in the linear subspace generated by them. (Baker 1922a, vol 1, p. 33) A syzygy is a linear relation between points in an affine space.
2. An algebraic relation between generators of a ring, especially a ring of invariants or covariants.
3. A linear relation between generators of a module, or more generally an element of the kernel of a homomorphism of modules.
4. A global syzygy is a resolution of a module or sheaf.

== T ==
tacnode
A tacnode is a point of a curve where two branches meet in the same direction. (Cayley 1852)
tacnode-cusp
A singularity of a plane curve where a tacnode and a cusp are combined at the same point. (Salmon 1879, p.207)
tact-invariant
An invariant of two curves that vanishes if they touch each other. See Salmon (1879, p.76).
tangent cone
A tangent cone is a cone defined by the non-zero terms of smallest degree in the Taylor series at a point of a hypersurface.
tangential equation
The tangential equation of a plane curve is an equation giving the condition for a line to be tangent to the curve. In other words it is the equation of the dual curve. It is not the equation of a tangent to a curve.
ternary
Depending on three variables, as in ternary form
tetrad
A set of 4 points
tetragram
Synonym for complete quadrilateral
tetrahedroid
A tetrahedroid is a special kind of Kummer surface.
tetrahedron
A geometric configuration consisting of 4 points and the 6 lines joining pairs. This is similar to the lines and infinite edges of a polyhedral tetrahedron, but in algebraic geometry one sometimes does not include the faces of the tetrahedron.
tetrastigm
Synonym for complete quadrangle
third kind
All poles are simple (order 1)
threefold
1. (Adjective) Three-dimensional
2. (Noun) A 3-dimensional variety
torsal generator.
A generator of a scroll (ruled surface) that meets its consecutive generator. See (Semple & Roth 1949, p.204).
torse
Developable surface.
transvectant
An invariant depending on two forms.
transversal
A line meeting several other lines. For example, 4 generic lines in projective 3-space have 2 transversals meeting all of them.
triad
A set of 3 points
tricircular
A tricircular curve is one that passes through the circular points at infinity with order 3.
tricuspidal
Having three cusps
trigonal
A trigonal curve is one with a degree three map to the projective line. See hyperelliptic.
trihedral
A set of 3 planes A Steiner trihedral is a set of three tritangent planes of a cubic surface whose intersection point is not on the surface. (Semple & Roth 1949, p.152)
trilinear coordinates
Coordinates based on distance from sides of a triangle: Trilinear coordinates.
trinodal
Having three nodes
tripartite
Having three connected components. Salmon (1879, p.165)
trisecant
A line meeting a variety in 3 points. See trisecant identity.
tritangent
Meeting something in 3 tangent points, such as a tritangent conic to a cubic curve or a tritangent plane of a cubic surface.
trope
A trope is a singular (meaning special) tangent space. (Cayley 1869, p.202) The word is mostly used for a tangent space of a Kummer surface touching it along a conic.
twisted
A twisted cubic is a degree 3 embedding of the projective line in projective 3-space
total
A set of 5 partitions of a 6-element set into three pairs, such that no two elements of the total have a pair in common. For example, {(12)(36)(45), (13)(24)(56), (14)(26)(35), (15)(23)(46), (16)(25)(34)} (Dolgachev 2012)
type
The type of a projective surface is the number of tangent planes meeting a generic linear subspace of codimension 4. (Semple & Roth 1949, p.193)

== U ==
undulation
A point of undulation of a curve is where the tangent meets the curve to fourth order; also called a hyperflex. See inflection point. (Salmon 1879, p.35, 211)
unibranch
Having only one branch at a point. For example, a cusp of a plane curve is unibranch, while a node is not.
unicursal
A unicursal curve is one that is rational, in other words birational to the projective line. See Salmon (1879, p. 29).
unipartite
Connected. See Salmon (1879, p.165)
unirational
1. A correspondence is called unirational if it is generically injective, in other words a rational map. (Semple & Roth 1949, p.20)
2. A variety is called unirational if it is finitely covered by a rational variety.
united point
A point in the intersection of the diagonal and a correspondence from a set to itself.
unode
A double point of a surface whose tangent cone consists of one double plane. See binode.

== V ==
valence
valency
The valence or valency of a correspondence T on a curve is a number k such that the divisors T(P)+kP are all linearly equivalent. A correspondence need not have a valency. (Semple & Roth 1949, p.368)
Veronese surface
An embedding of the projective plane in 5-dimensional projective space.
virtual
An estimate for something that is often but not always correct, such as virtual genus, virtual dimension, and so on. If some number is given by the dimension of a space of sections of some sheaf, the corresponding virtual number is sometimes given by the corresponding Euler characteristic, and equal to the dimension when all higher cohomology groups vanish. See superabundance.

== W ==
web
A 3-dimensional linear system. See "net" and "pencil". (Semple & Roth 1949, p.160)
Weddle surface
A quartic surface in projective space given by the locus of the vertex of a cone passing through 6 points in general position.
Weierstrass point
A point on a curve where the dimension of the space of rational functions whose only singularity is a pole of some order at the point is higher than normal.
Wirtinger sextic
A degree 4 genus 6 plane curve with nodes at the 6 points of a complete quadrangle.

== XYZ ==
Zeuthen–Segre invariant
The Zeuthen–Segre invariant is 4 less than the Euler characteristic of a non-singular projective surface.

== See also ==
- Glossary of algebraic geometry
- Glossary of arithmetic and Diophantine geometry
- Glossary of commutative algebra
- Glossary of differential geometry and topology
- Glossary of invariant theory
- Glossary of Riemannian and metric geometry
- Glossary of scheme theory
- List of complex and algebraic surfaces
- List of surfaces
- List of curves
