= Concomitant =

Concomitance is the condition of accompanying or coexisting. A concomitant is something that accompanies something else.

Concomitant or concomitance may refer to:

- Concomitance (doctrine), a Christian doctrine
- Concomitant (classical algebraic geometry), an invariant homogeneous polynomial in the coefficients of a form, a covariant variable, and a contravariant variable
- Concomitant (invariant theory), a relative invariant of GL(V) acting on the polynomials over Sn(V)⊕V⊕V*
- Concomitant (statistics), a statistic that arises when one sorts the members of a random sample according to the corresponding values of another random sample
- Concomitant drug, a drug given at the same time as, or shortly after, another drug
- Concomitantly variable codon, a codon in a computational phylogenetic model in which the hypothesized rate of molecular evolution varies in an autocorrelated manner

== See also ==
- Concomitant disease in pregnancy, a pre-existing disease that may worsen during pregnancy
