= George Salmon =

Irish mathematician and Anglican theologian (1819–1904)

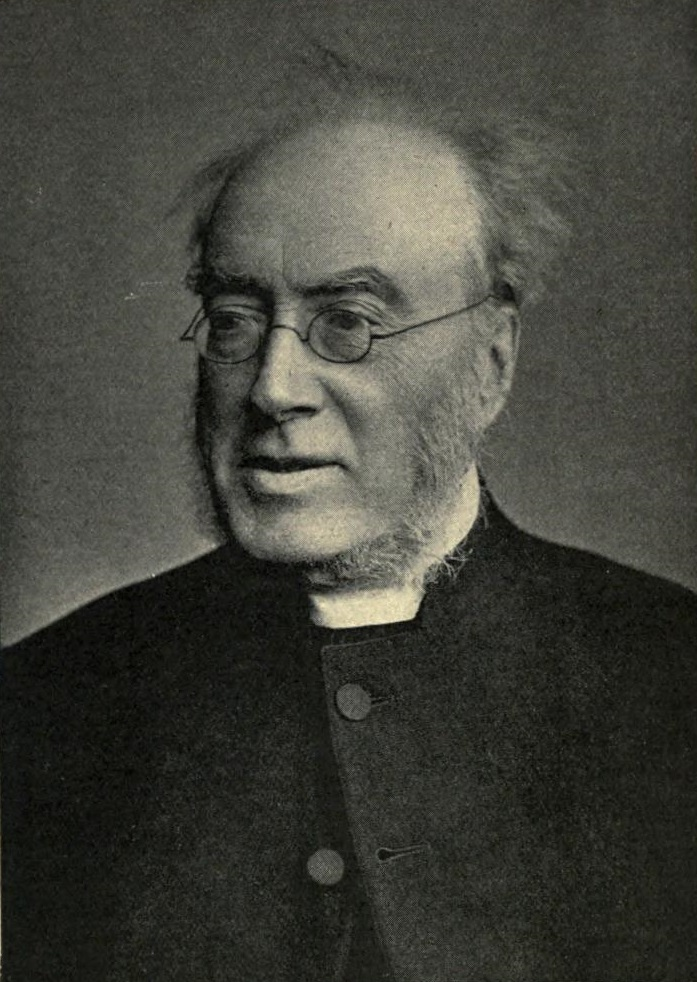

32nd Provost of Trinity College Dublin
- In office 1 June 1888 – 22 January 1904
- Preceded by: John Hewitt Jellett
- Succeeded by: Anthony Traill

Personal details
- Born: 25 September 1819 Cork, Ireland
- Died: 22 January 1904 (aged 84) Dublin, Ireland
- Resting place: Mount Jerome Cemetery, Dublin, Ireland
- Spouse: Frances Anne Salvador (m. 1844)
- Education: Trinity College, Dublin (B.A., 1839)
- Awards: Royal Medal (1868); Copley Medal (1889)

George Salmon FBA FRS FRSE (25 September 1819 – 22 January 1904) was a distinguished and influential Irish mathematician and Anglican theologian. After working in algebraic geometry for two decades, Salmon devoted the last forty years of his life to theology. His entire career was spent at Trinity College Dublin, having served as the 32nd Provost of the university from 1888 to 1904.

== Personal life ==
Salmon was born in Cork in 1819, to Michael Salmon and Helen Weekes (the daughter of the Reverend Edward Weekes). During his boyhood in Cork, where his father Michael was a linen merchant, he attended Hamblin and Porter's School there before starting at Trinity College Dublin in 1833.

In 1837, he won a scholarship and graduated from Trinity in 1839 with first-class honours in mathematics. In 1841, at the age of 21, he attained a paid fellowship and teaching position in mathematics at Trinity. In 1845, he was additionally appointed to a position in theology at the university, after having been ordained a deacon in 1844 and a priest in the Church of Ireland in 1845.

He remained at Trinity for the rest of his career.

He died at the Provost's House on 22 January 1904 and was buried in Mount Jerome Cemetery, Dublin. He was an avid reader throughout his life, and his obituary refers to him as "specially devoted to the novels of Jane Austen."

In 1844, he married Frances Anne Salvador, daughter of Rev J L Salvador of Staunton-upon-Wye in Herefordshire, with whom he had six children, of whom only two survived him.

== Academic career ==
=== Mathematics ===
In the late 1840s and the 1850s, Salmon was in regular and frequent communication with Arthur Cayley and J. J. Sylvester. The three of them, together with a small number of other mathematicians (including Charles Hermite), were developing a system for dealing with n-dimensional algebra and geometry. During this period Salmon published about 36 papers in journals. In these papers for the most part he solved narrowly defined, concrete problems in algebraic geometry, as opposed to more broadly systematic or foundational questions. But he was an early adopter of the foundational innovations of Cayley and the others. In 1859, he published the book Lessons Introductory to the Modern Higher Algebra (where the word "higher" means n-dimensional). This was for a while simultaneously the state-of-the-art and the standard presentation of the subject, and went through updated and expanded editions in 1866, 1876 and 1885, and was translated into German and French.

From 1858 to 1867, he was the Donegall Lecturer in Mathematics at Trinity.

Meanwhile, back in 1848, Salmon had published an undergraduate textbook entitled A Treatise on Conic Sections. This text remained in print for over fifty years, going through five updated editions in English, and was translated into German, French, Italian, and Japanese. Salmon himself did not participate in the expansions and updates of the later editions. The German version, which was a "free adaptation" by Wilhelm Fiedler, was popular as an undergraduate text in Germany. Salmon also published two other mathematics texts, A Treatise on Higher Plane Curves (1852) and A Treatise on the Analytic Geometry of Three Dimensions (1862). These too were in print for a long time and went through a number of later editions, with Salmon delegating the work of the later editions to others.

In 1858, he was presented with the Cunningham Medal of the Royal Irish Academy. In June 1863, he was elected a Fellow of the Royal Society followed in 1868 by the award of their Royal Medal "For his researches in analytical geometry and the theory of surfaces". In 1889 Salmon received the Copley Medal of the society, the highest honorary award in British science, but by then he had long since lost his interest in mathematics and science.

He was elected to honorary membership of the Manchester Literary and Philosophical Society, in 1889, and received honorary degrees from several universities, including that of Doctor mathematicae (honoris causa) from the Royal Frederick University on 6 September 1902, when they celebrated the centennial of the birth of mathematician Niels Henrik Abel.

Salmon's theorem is named in honour of George Salmon.

=== Theology ===
From the early 1860s, Salmon was primarily occupied with theology. In 1866, he was appointed Regius Professor of Divinity at Trinity College, at which point he resigned from his position in the mathematics department at TCD. In 1871, he accepted an additional post of chancellor of St. Patrick's Cathedral, Dublin.

One of his early publications in theology was in 1853 as a contributor to a book of rebuttals to the Tracts for the Times. Arguments against Roman Catholicism were a recurring theme in Salmon's theology and culminated in his widely read 1888 book Infallibility of the Church in which he argued that certain beliefs of the Roman church were absurd, especially the beliefs in the infallibility of the church and the infallibility of the pope. Salmon also wrote books about eternal punishment, miracles, and interpretation of the New Testament. His book An Historical Introduction to the Study of the Books of the New Testament, which was widely read, is an account of the reception and interpretation of the gospels in the early centuries of Christianity as seen through the writings of leaders such as Irenaeus and Eusebius.

== Chess ==
Salmon was a keen chess player. He was a patron to the University Chess Club, and was also the President of Dublin Chess Club from 1890–1903. He participated in the second British Chess Congress and had the honour of playing the chess prodigy Paul Morphy in Birmingham, England, on 27 August 1858. He beat Daniel Harrwitz in an interesting game.

Even in his book Infallibility of the Church, Salmon mentions chess a few times:

- He argues that the doctrine of papal infallibility is vitally important for opponents of Catholicism to refute; otherwise, all other arguments would be of little importance, as when a chess player wins many pieces but his king is checkmated.
- In another chess reference Salmon said that if one met someone who says that he has never been beaten, this player could be given rook odds. Thus "the delusion of invincibility can never grow up in the mind of anyone except one who has never met a strong antagonist."
- Salmon said that if one played someone who would normally receive queen odds, then one would go easy and not be too strict, e.g. allowing take-backs. Thus he is so convinced that the Popes have erred that he is not threatened by acknowledging when they have been right.

== Provost of Trinity College Dublin ==
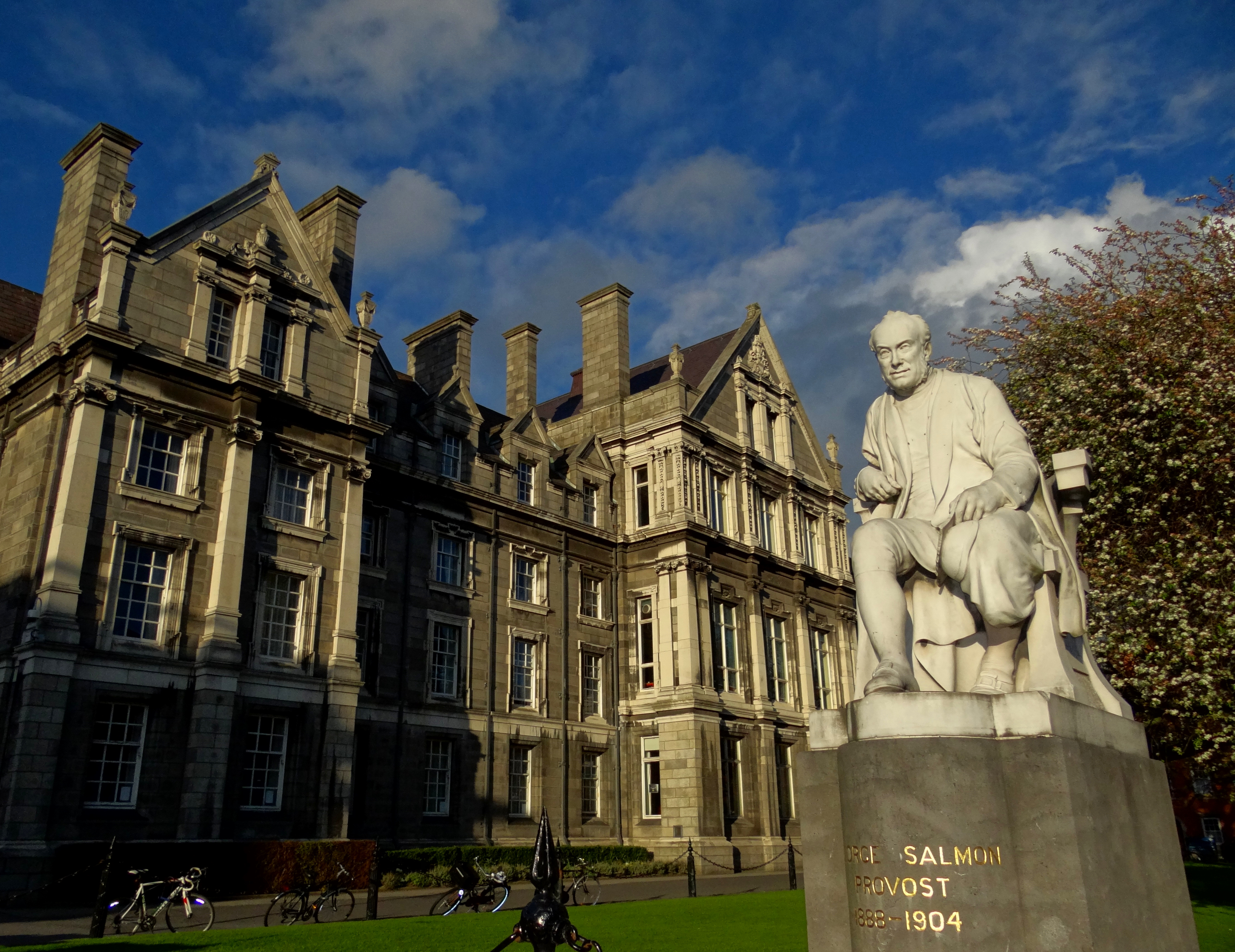
Sculpture by John Hughes of George Salmon in Trinity

Salmon was Provost of Trinity from 1888 until his death in 1904. The highlight of his career may have been when in 1892 he presided over the great celebrations marking the tercentenary of the College, which had been founded by Queen Elizabeth I in 1592.

=== Admission of women to Trinity ===
In 1870, Trinity had introduced the Examinations for Women, following a request from Alexandra College. In 1880, while Humphrey Lloyd was provost, Samuel Haughton, Anthony Traill, John Jellett and others proposed that degrees be open to women, on the same terms as men. Lloyd, as provost, was not a supporter, and the motion was defeated. In 1881, Jellett became provost, and a committee was set up in 1882 to investigate the matter, including future provosts Salmon and Traill, respectively opposing and supporting admission. Despite the support of the provost, the committee was not effective.

Salmon was provost during the campaign for admission by the Central Association of Irish Schoolmistresses (CAISM), in which Alice Oldham was an important figure. Salmon and the board were not generally receptive to the campaign. While Salmon was a conservative, his strong opposition to the admission of women cannot be dismissed simply; he had been a member of the council of Alexandra College, had supported girls competing on equal terms with boys in Intermediate examinations and his daughter, from the provost's house, had acted as coordinator for the Examinations for Women and was a member of CAISM. In 1896, all eight members of the board were over 70 years of age, but by 1901 retirements and deaths had resulted in the majority of the board being pro-admission.

In 1902, John Mahaffy proposed that the time had come to take action on the issue of awarding degrees to women. This was passed by the board, and, though the motion was opposed by Salmon, a committee was set up to report, and by the end of the year the board resolved that the Lord Lieutenant, William Ward should be petitioned to move the king to issue new Letters Patent for admission of Women. In 1903, Ward replied, indicating that the agreement of the provost was essential before Letters Patent would be issued. Salmon wrote withdrawing his formal objections in July 1903. The Letters Patent were received by the board on 16 January 1904. This was Salmon's last board meeting.

On 22 January 1904, Isabel Marion Weir Johnston became the first woman undergraduate to succeed in registering at Trinity, and by the end of the year, dozens of other women had done likewise. She recalled, "When I arrived in Dublin 1904, I was informed that he [Salmon] had died that day, and the examination had to be put off until after the funeral."

=== Death ===
Salmon continued to attend board meetings up to his death. At his death, Salmon had been a familiar figure in Trinity for over 62 years, and was held in affection even by those who disagreed with him. Both Traill and Mahaffy were eager to succeed Salmon as provost, and were lobbying to secure the position on the day of his death. Just before his death, Salmon is said to have anticipated this in another apocryphal story. He dreamt that he was dead, and his funeral was processing across Front Square, followed by weeping Fellows and Scholars. His coffin was laid in the chapel, "and then", he said, "I sat up in my coffin, whereupon Mahaffy and Traill wept louder than ever".

== Bibliography ==
- 1848: A Treatise on Conic Sections, Third edition, 1855, Fourth edition, 1863 via Internet Archive
- 1852: A Treatise on Higher Plane Curves: Intended as a sequel to a Treatise on Conic Sections, Third edition, 1879
- 1859: Lessons Introductory to the Modern Higher Algebra 172 pages. 2nd edition (1866) 326 pages. 3rd edition, 1876 354 pages. 4th edition (1885) 360 pages (with some additions by Cathcart to the chapters on binary quantics). 5th edition (1964) 376 pages ISBN 978-0828401500 (the contents of the 4th edition, together with some sections from the 2nd edition omitted in the 3rd and 4th editions).
- 1862: A Treatise on the Analytic Geometry of Three Dimensions; 5th edition, 1915 via Internet Archive, Reviews:
- 1864: The Eternity of Future Punishment
- 1873: The Reign of Law
- 1881: Non-miraculous Christianity
- 1885: Introduction to the New Testament
- 1888: The Infallibility of the Church, Third edition, 1899
- 1897: Some Thoughts on the Textual Criticism of the New Testament via Internet Archive

== See also ==
- Cubic surface
- Glossary of invariant theory
- Quaternary cubic
- Ternary quartic
- Salmon points

Academic offices
Preceded by John Hewitt Jellett	Provost of Trinity College Dublin; 1888–1904	Succeeded by Anthony Traill
