= Henry F. Baker =

British mathematician (1866–1956)

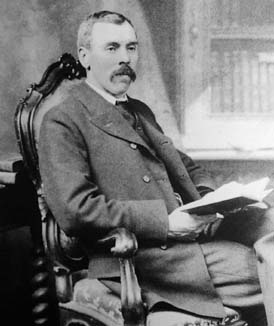
- Born: Henry Frederick Baker; 3 July 1866; Cambridge, England
- Died: 17 March 1956 (aged 89); Cambridge, England
- Resting place: Ascension Parish Burial Ground, Cambridge, England
- Education: St John's College, Cambridge
- Known for: Baker–Campbell–Hausdorff formula Cremona–Richmond configuration Eleven-point conic
- Awards: Smith's Prize (1889); FRS (1898); Sylvester Medal (1910); De Morgan Medal (1905)
- Scientific career
- Fields: Mathematician; Geometry
- Workplaces: University of Cambridge
- Doctoral advisor: Arthur Cayley
- Doctoral students: Jacob Bronowski; Thomas M. Cherry; H. S. M. Coxeter; Yusuke Hagihara; Edwin Arthur Maxwell; Louis J. Mordell; Daniel Pedoe; Thomas Gerald Room; John A. Todd

Henry Frederick Baker FRS FRSE (3 July 1866 – 17 March 1956) was a British mathematician, working mainly in algebraic geometry, but also remembered for contributions to partial differential equations (related to what would become known as solitons), and Lie groups.

== Early life ==
He was born in Cambridge the son of Henry Baker, a butler, and Sarah Ann Britham.

== Education ==
He was educated at The Perse School before winning a scholarship to St John's College, Cambridge in October 1884. Baker graduated as Senior Wrangler in 1887, bracketed with 3 others. His doctoral advisor was Arthur Cayley.

== Career ==
Baker was elected Fellow of St John's in 1888 where he remained for 68 years.

In June 1898, he was elected a Fellow of the Royal Society. In 1911, he gave the presidential address to the London Mathematical Society.

Baker was one of the mathematicians (along with E. W. Hobson) to whom Srinivasa Ramanujan wrote before G. H. Hardy but his papers were returned without comment.

In January 1914, he was appointed Lowndean Professor of Astronomy.

Gordon Welchman recalled that in the 1930s before the war Dennis Babbage and he were members of a group of geometers known as Professor Baker's "Tea Party", who met once a week to discuss the areas of research in which we were all interested.

He married twice. Firstly in 1893, to Lilly Isabella Hamfield Klopp, who died in 1903, then he remarried in 1913, to Muriel Irene Woodyard.

He died in Cambridge and is buried at the Ascension Parish Burial Ground, with his second wife Muriel (1885–1956).

== Publications ==
- Baker, Henry Frederick (1922), Principles of geometry. Volume 1. Foundations, Cambridge Library Collection, Cambridge University Press, doi:10.1017/CBO9780511718267.007, ISBN 978-1-108-01777-0, MR 2849917
- Baker, Henry Frederick (1922), Principles of geometry. Volume 2. Plane geometry, Conics, circles, non-Euclidean geometry, Cambridge Library Collection, Cambridge University Press, doi:10.1017/CBO9780511718298.009, ISBN 978-1-108-01778-7, MR 2857757
- Baker, Henry Frederick (1923), Principles of geometry. Volume 3. Solid geometry. Quadrics, cubic curves in space, cubic surfaces., Cambridge Library Collection, Cambridge University Press, ISBN 978-1-108-01779-4, MR 2857520
- Baker, Henry Frederick (1925), Principles of geometry. Volume 4. Higher geometry. Being illustrations of the utility of the consideration of higher space, especially of four and five dimensions, Cambridge Library Collection, Cambridge University Press, ISBN 978-1-108-01780-0, MR 2849669
- Baker, Henry Frederick (1933), Principles of geometry. Volume 5. Analytical principles of the theory of curves, Cambridge Library Collection, Cambridge University Press, ISBN 978-1-108-01781-7, MR 2850139
- Baker, Henry Frederick (1933), Principles of geometry. Volume 6. Introduction to the theory of algebraic surfaces and higher loci., Cambridge Library Collection, Cambridge University Press, ISBN 978-1-108-01782-4, MR 2850141
- Abel's theorem and the allied theory, including the theory of the theta functions (Cambridge: The University Press, 1897)
- An introduction to the theory of multiply periodic functions (Cambridge: The University Press, 1907)
- 1943 An Introduction to Plane Geometry
