= Quaternary cubic =

In mathematics, a quaternary cubic form is a degree 3 homogeneous polynomial in four variables. The zeros form a cubic surface in 3-dimensional projective space.

== Invariants ==
Salmon (1860) and Clebsch (1861, 1861b) studied the ring of invariants of a quaternary cubic, which is a ring generated by invariants of degrees 8, 16, 24, 32, 40, 100. The generators of degrees 8, 16, 24, 32, 40 generate a polynomial ring. The generator of degree 100 is a skew invariant, whose square is a polynomial in the other generators given explicitly by Salmon. Salmon also gave an explicit formula for the discriminant as a polynomial in the generators, though Edge (1980) pointed out that the formula has a widely copied misprint in it.

== Sylvester pentahedron ==
A generic quaternary cubic can be written as a sum of 5 cubes of linear forms, unique up to multiplication by cube roots of unity. This was conjectured by Sylvester in 1851, and proven 10 years later by Clebsch. The union of the 5 planes where these 5 linear forms vanish is called the Sylvester pentahedron.

== See also ==
- Ternary cubic
- Ternary quartic
- Invariants of a binary form
