= Binary form (disambiguation) =

Binary form may refer to:

- In music, binary form is a form (structure) consisting of two related parts.
- In computer science and mathematics, number in the binary form refers to the use of binary numeral system.
- In mathematics, a binary form is a homogeneous polynomial in two variables.
- The article binary quadratic form discusses binary forms of degree two.
- The article invariant of a binary form discusses binary forms of higher degree.
- Binary form is another name for a binary quantic
