= Subvariant =

The term subvariant has at least two applications.

- A mathematical term in invariant theory associated with the concept perpetuant.
- In microbiology and virology, a subvariant is a subtype of a known variant of a microorganism.
