= Edwin Maxwell =

Edwin Maxwell may refer to:

- Edwin Maxwell (actor) (1886–1948), Irish character actor
- Edwin Maxwell (politician) (1825–1903), American lawyer, judge, and politician
- Edwin A. Maxwell (1907–1987), Scottish mathematician

== See also ==
- Maxwell Fry (Edwin Maxwell Fry, 1899–1987), English modernist architect
