= Heterotachy =

Heterotachy refers to variations in lineage-specific evolutionary rates over time. In the field of molecular evolution, the principle of heterotachy states that the substitution rate of sites in a gene can change through time. It has been proposed that the positions that show switches in substitution rate over time (that is, heterotachous sites) are good indicators of functional divergence. However, it appears that heterotachy is a much more general process, since most variable sites of homologous proteins with no evidence of functional shift are heterotachous.

The covarion hypothesis is a specific form of heterotachy. Some studies have proposed functional divergence models that are also heterotachous. Additionally, some mixture models that do not explicitly account for rate-shift, but site-partitions evolving at different relative substitution rates across lineages are mathematically heterotachous.

Failure to take heterotachy into account in phylogenetic reconstructions may lead to incorrect phylogenetic trees. Thus Zhong et al. (2011) say that heterotachy is one of the reasons for variability in reconstructions of the origin of gnetophytes.
