= Hankel matrix =

Square matrix in which each ascending skew-diagonal from left to right is constant

In linear algebra, a Hankel matrix (or catalecticant matrix), named after Hermann Hankel, is a rectangular matrix in which each ascending skew-diagonal from left to right is constant. For example,

$$\qquad\begin{bmatrix}
a & b & c & d & e \\
b & c & d & e & f \\
c & d & e & f & g \\
d & e & f & g & h \\
e & f & g & h & i \\
\end{bmatrix}.$$

More generally, a Hankel matrix is any $n \times n$ matrix $A$ of the form

$$A = \begin{bmatrix}
a_0 & a_1 & a_2 & \ldots & a_{n-1}  \\
a_1 & a_2 &  &  &\vdots \\
a_2 &  &  & & a_{2n-4} \\
\vdots & &  & a_{2n-4} & a_{2n-3} \\
a_{n-1} &  \ldots & a_{2n-4} & a_{2n-3} & a_{2n-2}
\end{bmatrix}.$$

In terms of the components, if the $i,j$ element of $A$ is denoted with $A_{ij}$, and assuming $i \le j$, then we have $A_{i,j} = A_{i+k,j-k}$ for all $k = 0,...,j-i.$

== Properties ==
- Any square Hankel matrix is symmetric.
- Let $J_n$ be the $n \times n$ exchange matrix. If $H$ is an $m \times n$ Hankel matrix, then $H = T J_n$ where $T$ is an $m \times n$ Toeplitz matrix.
- If $T$ is real symmetric, then $H = T J_n$ will have the same eigenvalues as $T$ up to sign.
- The Hilbert matrix is an example of a Hankel matrix.
- The determinant of a Hankel matrix is called a catalecticant.
- If $H$ is an $n \times n$ Hankel matrix, then $H=V^TDV$ where $V$ is a confluent Vandermonde matrix and $D$ is a block diagonal matrix, with symmetric and upper anti-triangular blocks.

== Hankel operator ==
Given a formal Laurent series
$$f(z) = \sum_{n=-\infty}^N a_n z^n,$$
the corresponding Hankel operator is defined as
$$H_f : \mathbf C[z] \to z^{-1} \mathbf C[[z^{-1}]].$$
This takes a polynomial $g \in \mathbf C[z]$ and sends it to the product $fg$, but discards all powers of $z$ with a non-negative exponent, so as to give an element in $z^{-1} \mathbf C[[z^{-1}]]$, the formal power series with strictly negative exponents. The map $H_f$ is in a natural way $\mathbf C[z]$-linear, and its matrix with respect to the elements $1, z, z^2, \dots \in \mathbf C[z]$ and $z^{-1}, z^{-2}, \dots \in z^{-1}\mathbf C[[z^{-1}]]$ is the Hankel matrix
$$\begin{bmatrix}
a_{-1} & a_{-2} & \ldots \\
a_{-2} & a_{-3} & \ldots \\
a_{-3} & a_{-4} & \ldots \\
\vdots & \vdots & \ddots
\end{bmatrix}.$$
Any Hankel matrix arises in this way. A theorem due to Kronecker says that the rank of this matrix is finite precisely if $f$ is a rational function, that is, a fraction of two polynomials
$$f(z) = \frac{p(z)}{q(z)}.$$

== Approximations ==
We are often interested in approximations of the Hankel operators, possibly by low-order operators. In order to approximate the output of the operator, we can use the spectral norm (operator 2-norm) to measure the error of our approximation. This suggests singular value decomposition as a possible technique to approximate the action of the operator.

Note that the matrix $A$ does not have to be finite. If it is infinite, traditional methods of computing individual singular vectors will not work directly. We also require that the approximation is a Hankel matrix, which can be shown with AAK theory.

== Hankel matrix transform ==
The Hankel matrix transform, or simply Hankel transform, of a sequence $b_k$ is the sequence of the determinants of the Hankel matrices formed from $b_k$. Given an integer $n > 0$, define the corresponding $(n \times n)$-dimensional Hankel matrix $B_n$ as having the matrix elements $[B_n]_{i,j} = b_{i+j}.$ Then the sequence $h_n$ given by
$$h_n = \det B_n$$
is the Hankel transform of the sequence $b_k.$ The Hankel transform is invariant under the binomial transform of a sequence. That is, if one writes
$$c_n = \sum_{k=0}^n {n \choose k} b_k$$
as the binomial transform of the sequence $b_n$, then one has $\det B_n = \det C_n.$

== Applications of Hankel matrices ==
Hankel matrices are formed when, given a sequence of output data, a realization of an underlying state-space or hidden Markov model is desired. The singular value decomposition of the Hankel matrix provides a means of computing the A, B, and C matrices which define the state-space realization. The Hankel matrix formed from the signal has been found useful for decomposition of non-stationary signals and time-frequency representation.

=== Method of moments for polynomial distributions ===
The method of moments applied to polynomial distributions results in a Hankel matrix that needs to be inverted in order to obtain the weight parameters of the polynomial distribution approximation.

== See also ==
- Cauchy matrix
- Jacobi operator
- Toeplitz matrix, an "upside down" (that is, row-reversed) Hankel matrix
- Vandermonde matrix
