= Steinerian =

In algebraic geometry, a Steinerian of a hypersurface, introduced by Steiner (1854), is the locus of the singular points of its polar quadrics.
