= Ternary cubic =

In mathematics, a ternary cubic form is a homogeneous degree 3 polynomial in three variables.

== Invariant theory ==
The ternary cubic is one of the few cases of a form of degree greater than 2 in more than 2 variables whose ring of invariants was calculated explicitly in the 19th century.

=== The ring of invariants ===
The algebra of invariants of a ternary cubic under SL_{3}(C) is a polynomial algebra generated by two invariants S and T of degrees 4 and 6, called Aronhold invariants. The invariants are rather complicated when written as polynomials in the coefficients of the ternary cubic, and are given explicitly in (Sturmfels 1993, 4.4.7, 4.5.3)

=== The ring of covariants ===
The ring of covariants is given as follows. (Dolgachev 2012, 3.4.3)

The identity covariant U of a ternary cubic has degree 1 and order 3.

The Hessian H is a covariant of ternary cubics of degree 3 and order 3.

There is a covariant G of ternary cubics of degree 8 and order 6 that vanishes on points x lying on the Salmon conic of the polar of x with respect to the curve and its Hessian curve.

The Brioschi covariant J is the Jacobian of U, G, and H of degree 12, order 9.

The algebra of covariants of a ternary cubic is generated over the ring of invariants by U, G, H, and J, with a relation that the square of J is a polynomial in the other generators.

=== The ring of contravariants ===
(Dolgachev 2012, 3.4.3)

The Clebsch transfer of the discriminant of a binary cubic is a contravariant F of ternary cubics of degree 4 and class 6, giving the dual cubic of a cubic curve.

The Cayleyan P of a ternary cubic is a contravariant of degree 3 and class 3.

The quippian Q of a ternary cubic is a contravariant of degree 5 and class 3.

The Hermite contravariant Π is another contravariant of ternary cubics of degree 12 and class 9.

The ring of contravariants is generated over the ring of invariants by F, P, Q, and Π, with a relation that Π^{2} is a polynomial in the other generators.

=== The ring of concomitants ===
Gordan (1869) and Cayley (1881) described the ring of concomitants, giving 34 generators.

The Clebsch transfer of the Hessian of a binary cubic is a concomitant of degree 2, order 2, and class 2.

The Clebsch transfer of the Jacobian of the identity covariant and the Hessian of a binary cubic is a concomitant of ternary cubics of degree 3, class 3, and order 3

== See also ==
- Ternary quartic
- Invariants of a binary form
