= Canonizant =

In mathematical invariant theory, the canonizant or canonisant is a covariant of forms related to a canonical form for them.

== Canonizants of a binary form ==
The canonizant of a binary form of degree 2n – 1 is a covariant of degree n and order n, given by the catalecticant of the penultimate emanant, which is the determinant of the n by n Hankel matrix with entries a_{i+j}x + a_{i+j+1}y for 0 ≤ i,j < n.
