= Anthony Traill (college provost) =

Irish academic

33rd Provost of Trinity College Dublin
- In office 24 January 1904 – 15 October 1914
- Preceded by: George Salmon
- Succeeded by: John Pentland Mahaffy

Personal details
- Born: 1 November 1838 Ballylough, County Antrim, Ireland
- Died: 15 October 1914 (aged 75) Dublin, Ireland
- Education: Trinity College Dublin

Anthony Traill (1 November 1838 – 15 October 1914) was an Irish academic who served as the 33rd Provost of Trinity College Dublin from 1904 to 1914.

Traill was born Ballylough, County Antrim, in 1838. He matriculated at Trinity College Dublin, where he was elected a Scholar in 1858. He became a fellow in 1865, and while at college he accumulated degrees in engineering, law, and medicine.

Although he was most famous for the position he would acquire later in life, Traill was actively involved in politics during the 1870s and 1880s. He was an Ulster Unionist, and sided with the landlords during the debate over land tenure reform. In 1884, he was appointed High Sheriff of Antrim. He also became the chairman of the world's first electric tramway, Portrush, founded with his brother William. The Portrush electric tramway ran from Portrush to Bushmills from its inception in 1883 (with Traill as chairman) until 1947.

In April 1901, he was appointed Commissioner of National Education in Ireland.

In 1904, Traill was appointed Provost of Trinity College Dublin. During his hold of the office, he carried out many internal reforms. Traill refused to change the University's constitutional position at any time in his Provostship despite pressure. He remained the Provost until he died, at the Provost's House, in 1914.

Academic offices
| Preceded by George Salmon | Provost of Trinity College Dublin; 1904–1914 | Succeeded by John Pentland Mahaffy |
