= Trope (mathematics) =

In geometry, trope is an archaic term for a singular (meaning special) tangent space of a variety, often a quartic surface. The term may have been introduced by Cayley (1869, p. 202), who defined it as "the reciprocal term to node". It is not easy to give a precise definition, because the term is used mainly in older books and papers on algebraic geometry, whose definitions are vague and different, and use archaic terminology. The term trope is used in the theory of quartic surfaces in projective space, where it is sometimes defined as a tangent space meeting the quartic surface in a conic; for example Kummer's surface has 16 tropes.

Hudson (1990, p. 14), describes a trope as a tangent plane where the envelope of nearby tangent planes forms a conic, rather than a plane pencil which we would expect for a generic point. The tangent plane would be tangent to the quartic along the conic, implying that the Gauss map would have a singular point. (Dolgachev 2012, p. 437)

== See also ==
- Glossary of classical algebraic geometry
