= Quippian =

In mathematics, a quippian is a degree 5 class 3 contravariant of a plane cubic introduced by Arthur Cayley (1857) and discussed by Igor Dolgachev (2012, p.157). In the same paper Cayley also introduced another similar invariant that he called the pippian, now called the Cayleyan.

== See also ==
- Glossary of classical algebraic geometry
