= Jakob Steiner =

Swiss mathematician (1796–1863)

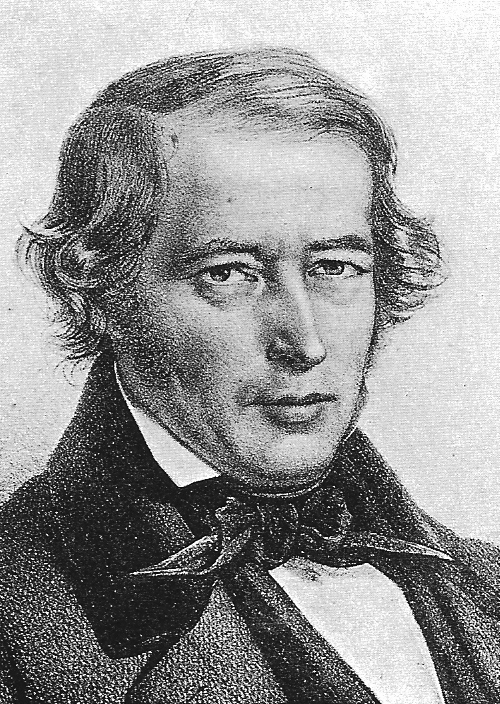
- Born: 18 March 1796; Utzenstorf, Canton of Bern, Old Swiss Confederacy
- Died: 1 April 1863 (aged 67); Bern, Switzerland
- Known for: Euclidean geometry Projective geometry Synthetic geometry
- Scientific career
- Fields: Mathematics

Jakob Steiner (18 March 1796 – 1 April 1863) was a Swiss mathematician who worked primarily in geometry.

== Life ==
Steiner was born in the village of Utzenstorf, Canton of Bern. At 18, he became a pupil of Heinrich Pestalozzi and afterwards studied at Heidelberg. Then, he went to Berlin, earning a livelihood there, as in Heidelberg, by tutoring. Here he became acquainted with A. L. Crelle, who, encouraged by his ability and by that of Niels Henrik Abel, then also staying at Berlin, founded his famous Journal (1826).

After Steiner's publication (1832) of his Systematische Entwickelungen he received, through Carl Gustav Jacob Jacobi, who was then professor at Königsberg University, and earned an honorary degree there; and through the influence of Jacobi and of the brothers Alexander and Wilhelm von Humboldt a new chair of geometry was founded for him at Berlin (1834). This he occupied until his death in Bern on 1 April 1863.

He was described by Thomas Hirst as follows:

"He is a middle-aged man, of pretty stout proportions, has a long intellectual face, with beard and moustache and a fine prominent forehead, hair dark rather inclining to turn grey. The first thing that strikes you on his face is a dash of care and anxiety, almost pain, as if arising from physical suffering—he has rheumatism. He never prepares his lectures beforehand. He thus often stumbles or fails to prove what he wishes at the moment, and at every such failure he is sure to make some characteristic remark."

== Mathematical contributions ==
Steiner's mathematical work was mainly confined to geometry. This he treated synthetically, to the total exclusion of analysis, which he hated, and he is said to have considered it a disgrace to synthetic geometry if equal or higher results were obtained by analytical geometry methods. In his own field he surpassed all his contemporaries. His investigations are distinguished by their great generality, by the fertility of his resources, and by the rigour in his proofs. He has been considered the greatest pure geometer since Apollonius of Perga.

In his Systematische Entwickelung der Abhängigkeit geometrischer Gestalten von einander he laid the foundation of modern synthetic geometry. In projective geometry even parallel lines have a point in common: a point at infinity. Thus two points determine a line and two lines determine a point. The symmetry of point and line is expressed as projective duality. Starting with perspectivities, the transformations of projective geometry are formed by composition, producing projectivities. Steiner identified sets preserved by projectivities such as a projective range and pencils. He is particularly remembered for his approach to a conic section by way of projectivity called the Steiner conic.

In a second little volume, Die geometrischen Constructionen ausgeführt mittels der geraden Linie und eines festen Kreises (1833), republished in 1895 by Ottingen, he shows, what had been already suggested by J. V. Poncelet, how all problems of the second order can be solved by aid of the straight edge alone without the use of compasses, as soon as one circle is given on the drawing-paper. He also wrote "Vorlesungen über synthetische Geometrie", published posthumously at Leipzig by C. F. Geiser and H. Schroeter in 1867; a third edition by R. Sturm was published in 1887–1898.

Other geometric results by Steiner include development of a formula for the partitioning of space by planes (the maximal number of parts created by n planes), several theorems about the famous Steiner's chain of tangential circles, and a proof of the isoperimetric theorem (later a flaw was found in the proof, but was corrected by Weierstrass).

The rest of Steiner's writings are found in numerous papers mostly published in Crelle's Journal, the first volume of which contains his first four papers. The most important are those relating to algebraic curves and surfaces, especially the short paper Allgemeine Eigenschaften algebraischer Curven. This contains only results, and there is no indication of the method by which they were obtained, so that, according to O. Hesse, they are, like Fermat's theorems, riddles to the present and future generations. Eminent analysts succeeded in proving some of the theorems, but it was reserved to Luigi Cremona to prove them all, and that by a uniform synthetic method, in his book on algebraic curves.

Other important investigations relate to maxima and minima. Starting from simple elementary propositions, Steiner advances to the solution of problems which analytically require the calculus of variations, but which at the time altogether surpassed the powers of that calculus. Connected with this is the paper Vom Krümmungsschwerpuncte ebener Curven, which contains numerous properties of pedals and roulettes, especially of their areas.

Steiner also made a small but important contribution to combinatorics. In 1853, Steiner published a two-page article in Crelle's Journal on what nowadays is called Steiner systems, a basic kind of block design.

His oldest papers and manuscripts (1823–1826) were published by his admirer Fritz Bützberger on the request of the Bernese Society for Natural Scientists.

== See also ==
- Arrangement of lines
- Malfatti circles
- Miquel and Steiner's quadrilateral theorem
- Minkowski–Steiner formula
- Mixed volume
- Power of a point theorem
- Steiner curve
- Steiner symmetrization
- Steiner system
- Steiner surface
- Steiner conic
- Steiner's conic problem
- Steiner's problem
- Steiner tree
- Steiner chain
- Poncelet–Steiner theorem
- Parallel axes rule
- Steiner–Lehmus theorem
- Steiner inellipse
- Steinerian
- Steiner point (computational geometry)
- Steiner point (triangle)
