= Edwin A. Maxwell =

Scottish mathematician

Edwin Arthur Maxwell (12 January 1907 – 27 August 1987) was a Scottish mathematician, who worked at Cambridge University for most of his career. Although his contributions to original research were limited, his main contribution was in the area of mathematical education, including his 1959 work Fallacies in Mathematics. His doctoral supervisor was H.F. Baker. He was president of the Mathematical Association.

He is buried in the Parish of the Ascension Burial Ground in Cambridge.
