= Cauchy matrix =

Matrix class

In mathematics, a Cauchy matrix, named after Augustin-Louis Cauchy, is an m×n matrix with elements a_{ij} in the form

$$a_{ij}={\frac{1}{x_i-y_j}};\quad x_i-y_j\neq 0,\quad 1 \le i \le m,\quad 1 \le j \le n$$

where $x_i$ and $y_j$ are elements of a field $\mathcal{F}$, and $(x_i)$ and $(y_j)$ are injective sequences (they contain distinct elements).

== Properties ==
Every submatrix of a Cauchy matrix is itself a Cauchy matrix.

The Hilbert matrix is a special case of the Cauchy matrix, where

$$x_i-y_j = i+j-1. \;$$

== Cauchy determinants ==
The determinant of a Cauchy matrix is clearly a rational fraction in the parameters $(x_i)$ and $(y_j)$. If the sequences were not injective, the determinant would vanish, and tends to infinity if some $x_i$ tends to $y_j$. A subset of its zeros and poles are thus known. The fact is that there are no more zeros and poles:

The determinant of a square Cauchy matrix A is known as a Cauchy determinant and can be given explicitly as

$\det \mathbf{A}={{\prod_{i=2}^n \prod_{j=1}^{i-1} (x_i-x_j)(y_j-y_i)}\over {\prod_{i=1}^n \prod_{j=1}^n (x_i-y_j)}}$ (Schechter 1959, eqn 4; Cauchy 1841, p. 154, eqn. 10).

It is always nonzero, and thus all square Cauchy matrices are invertible. The inverse A^{−1} = B = [b_{ij}] is given by

$b_{ij} = (x_j - y_i) A_j(y_i) B_i(x_j) \,$ (Schechter 1959, Theorem 1)

where A_{i}(x) and B_{i}(x) are the Lagrange polynomials for $(x_i)$ and $(y_j)$, respectively. That is,

$$A_i(x) = \frac{A(x)}{A^\prime(x_i)(x-x_i)} \quad\text{and}\quad B_i(x) = \frac{B(x)}{B^\prime(y_i)(x-y_i)},$$

with

$$A(x) = \prod_{i=1}^n (x-x_i) \quad\text{and}\quad B(x) = \prod_{i=1}^n (x-y_i).$$

== Generalization ==
A matrix C is called Cauchy-like if it is of the form

$$C_{ij}=\frac{r_i s_j}{x_i-y_j}.$$

Defining X=diag(x_{i}), Y=diag(y_{i}), one sees that both Cauchy and Cauchy-like matrices satisfy the displacement equation

$$\mathbf{XC}-\mathbf{CY}=rs^\mathrm{T}$$

(with $r=s=(1,1,\ldots,1)$ for the Cauchy one). Hence Cauchy-like matrices have a common displacement structure, which can be exploited while working with the matrix. For example, there are known algorithms in literature for

- approximate Cauchy matrix-vector multiplication with $O(n \log n)$ ops (e.g. the fast multipole method),
- (pivoted) LU factorization with $O(n^2)$ ops (GKO algorithm), and thus linear system solving,
- linear system solving in $\tilde O({\alpha ^{\omega - 1}}n)$ ops with the use of fast matrix multiplication algorithms, instead of $\tilde O({\alpha ^2}n)$ ops without it, where $\alpha$ is the displacement rank and $^ \sim 2.37 \le \omega < 3$.
- approximated or unstable algorithms for linear system solving in $O(n \log^2 n)$.

Here $n$ denotes the size of the matrix (one usually deals with square matrices, though all algorithms can be easily generalized to rectangular matrices).

== See also ==
- Toeplitz matrix
- Fay's trisecant identity
