= Hermite reciprocity =

Result in mathematical invariant theory

In mathematics, Hermite's law of reciprocity, introduced by Hermite (1854), states that the degree m covariants of a binary form of degree n correspond to the degree n covariants of a binary form of degree m. In terms of representation theory it states that the representations S^{m} S^{n} C^{2} and S^{n} S^{m} C^{2} of GL_{2} are isomorphic.
