= Kronecker =

Kronecker is a German surname. Notable people with the surname include:

- Hugo Kronecker (1839–1914), German physiologist, brother of Leopold
- Leopold Kronecker (1823–1891), German mathematician
