= Eleven-point conic =

In geometry, an eleven-point conic is a conic associated to four points and a line, containing 11 special points.(Baker 1922, p. 49)
