= Ternary quartic =

In mathematics, a ternary quartic form is a degree 4 homogeneous polynomial in three variables.

== Hilbert's theorem ==
Hilbert (1888) showed that a positive semi-definite ternary quartic form over the reals can be written as a sum of three squares of quadratic forms.

== Invariant theory ==
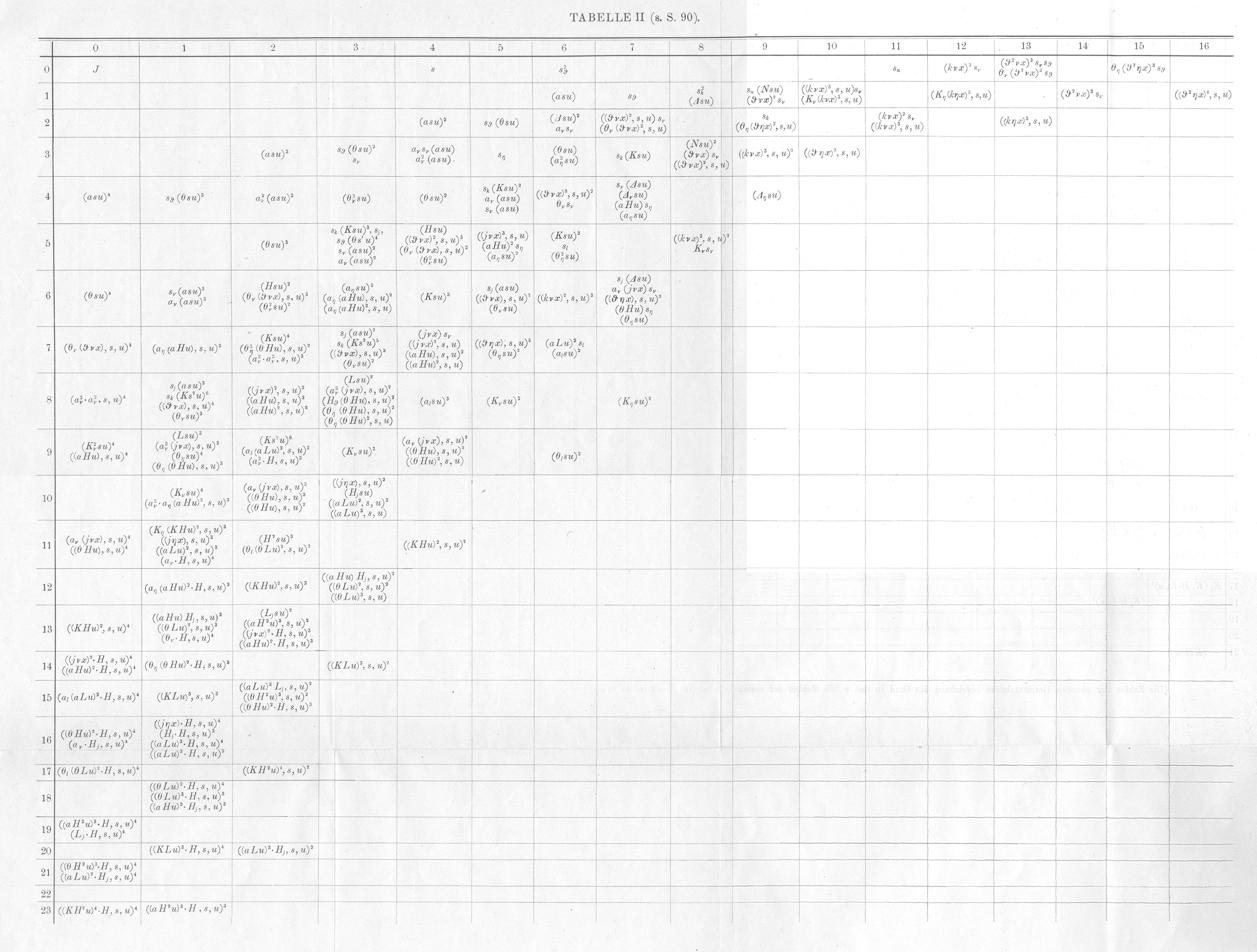
Table 2 from Noether's dissertation (Noether 1908) on invariant theory. This table collects 202 of the 331 invariants of ternary biquadratic forms. These forms are graded in two variables x and u. The horizontal direction of the table lists the invariants with increasing grades in x, while the vertical direction lists them with increasing grades in u.

The ring of invariants is generated by 7 algebraically independent invariants of degrees 3, 6, 9, 12, 15, 18, 27 (discriminant) (Dixmier 1987), together with 6 more invariants of degrees 9, 12, 15, 18, 21, 21, as conjectured by Shioda (1967). Salmon (1879) discussed the invariants of order up to about 15.

The Salmon invariant is a degree 60 invariant vanishing on ternary quartics with an inflection bitangent. (Dolgachev 2012, 6.4)

== Catalecticant ==
The catalecticant of a ternary quartic is the resultant of its 6 second partial derivatives. It vanishes when the ternary quartic can be written as a sum of five 4th powers of linear forms.

== See also ==
- Ternary cubic
- Invariants of a binary form
