= Invariant of a binary form =

In mathematical invariant theory, an invariant of a binary form is a polynomial in the coefficients of a binary form in two variables x and y that remains invariant under the special linear group acting on the variables x and y.

== Terminology ==
A binary form (of degree n) is a homogeneous polynomial $\sum_{i=0}^n \binom{n}{i} a_{n-i}x^{n-i}y^i = a_nx^n + \binom{n}{1} a_{n-1}x^{n-1}y + \cdots + a_0y^n$. The group $SL_2(\mathbb{C})$ acts on these forms by taking $x$ to $ax + by$ and $y$ to $cx + dy$. This induces an action on the space spanned by $a_0, \ldots, a_n$ and on the polynomials in these variables. An invariant is a polynomial in these $n + 1$ variables $a_0, \ldots, a_n$ that is invariant under this action. More generally a covariant is a polynomial in $a_0, \ldots, a_n$, $x$, $y$ that is invariant, so an invariant is a special case of a covariant where the variables $x$ and $y$ do not occur. More generally still, a simultaneous invariant is a polynomial in the coefficients of several different forms in $x$ and $y$.

In terms of representation theory, given any representation $V$ of the group $SL_2(\mathbb{C})$ one can ask for the ring of invariant polynomials on $V$. Invariants of a binary form of degree $n$ correspond to taking $V$ to be the $(n + 1)$-dimensional irreducible representation, and covariants correspond to taking $V$ to be the sum of the irreducible representations of dimensions 2 and $n + 1$.

The invariants of a binary form form a graded algebra, and Gordan (1868) proved that this algebra is finitely generated if the base field is the complex numbers.

Forms of degrees 2, 3, 4, 5, 6, 7, 8, 9, 10 are sometimes called quadrics, cubic, quartics, quintics, sextics, septics or septimics, octics or octavics, nonics, and decics or decimics. "Quantic" is an old name for a form of arbitrary degree. Forms in 1, 2, 3, 4, ... variables are called unary, binary, ternary, quaternary, ... forms.

== Examples ==
A form f is itself a covariant of degree 1 and order n.

The discriminant of a form is an invariant.

The resultant of two forms is a simultaneous invariant of them.

The Hessian covariant of a form Hilbert (1993, p.88) is the determinant of the Hessian matrix

$$H(f) = \begin{bmatrix}
\frac{\partial^2 f}{\partial x^2} & \frac{\partial^2 f}{\partial x\,\partial y}  \\[10pt]
\frac{\partial^2 f}{\partial y\,\partial x} & \frac{\partial^2 f}{\partial y^2}
\end{bmatrix}.$$

It is a covariant of order 2n− 4 and degree 2.

The catalecticant is an invariant of degree n/2+1 of a binary form of even degree n.

The canonizant is a covariant of degree and order (n+1)/2 of a binary form of odd degree n.

The Jacobian

$$\det \begin{bmatrix}
\frac{\partial f}{\partial x} & \frac{\partial f}{\partial y}  \\[10pt]
\frac{\partial g}{\partial x} & \frac{\partial g}{\partial y}
\end{bmatrix}$$

is a simultaneous covariant of two forms f, g.

== The ring of invariants ==
The structure of the ring of invariants has been worked out for small degrees. Sylvester & Franklin (1879) gave tables of the numbers of generators of invariants and covariants for forms of degree up to 10, though the tables have a few minor errors for large degrees, mostly where a few invariants or covariants are omitted.

=== Covariants of a binary linear form ===
For linear forms $F_1(x,y) = Ax + By$ the only invariants are constants. The algebra of covariants is generated by the form itself of degree 1 and order 1.

=== Covariants of a binary quadric ===
The algebra of invariants of the quadratic form $F_2(x,y) = Ax^2 + 2Bxy + Cy^2$ is a polynomial algebra in 1 variable generated by the discriminant $B^2 - AC$ of degree 2. The algebra of covariants is a polynomial algebra in 2 variables generated by the discriminant together with the form itself (of degree 1 and order 2). (Schur 1968, II.8) (Hilbert 1993, XVI, XX)

=== Covariants of a binary cubic ===
The algebra of invariants of the cubic form $F_3(x,y) = Ax^3 + 3Bx^2y + 3Cxy^2 + Dy^3$ is a polynomial algebra in 1 variable generated by the discriminant $\Delta = 3B^2C^2 + 6ABCD- 4B^3D - 4C^3A - A^2D^2$ of degree 4. The algebra of covariants is generated by the discriminant, the form itself (degree 1, order 3), the Hessian $H$ (degree 2, order 2) and a covariant $T$ of degree 3 and order 3. They are related by the syzygy $4H^3=Df^2-T^2$ of degree 6 and order 6. (Schur 1968, II.8) (Hilbert 1993, XVII, XX)

=== Covariants of a binary quartic ===
The algebra of invariants of a quartic form is generated by invariants $i$, $j$ of degrees 2, 3:
$$\begin{aligned}
F_4(x, y)&=A x^4+4 B x^3 y+6 C x^2 y^2+4 D x y^3+E y^4\\
i_{F_4}&=A E-4 B D+3 C^2 \\
j_{F_4}&=A C E+2 B C D-C^3-B^2 E-A D^2
\end{aligned}$$

This ring is naturally isomorphic to the ring of modular forms of level 1, with the two generators corresponding to the Eisenstein series $E_4$ and $E_6$. The algebra of covariants is generated by these two invariants together with the form $f$ of degree 1 and order 4, the Hessian $H$ of degree 2 and order 4, and a covariant $T$ of degree 3 and order 6. They are related by a syzygy $jf^3 - Hf^2i + 4H^3 + T^2 = 0$ of degree 6 and order 12. (Schur 1968, II.8) (Hilbert 1993, XVIII, XXII)

=== Covariants of a binary quintic ===
The algebra of invariants of a quintic form was found by Sylvester and is generated by invariants of degree 4, 8, 12, 18. The generators of degrees 4, 8, 12 generate a polynomial ring, which contains the square of Hermite's skew invariant of degree 18. The invariants are rather complicated to write out explicitly: Sylvester showed that the generators of degrees 4, 8, 12, 18 have 12, 59, 228, and 848 terms often with very large coefficients. (Schur 1968, II.9) (Hilbert 1993, XVIII) The ring of covariants is generated by 23 covariants, one of which is the canonizant of degree 3 and order 3.

=== Covariants of a binary sextic ===
The algebra of invariants of a sextic form is generated by invariants of degree 2, 4, 6, 10, 15. The generators of degrees 2, 4, 6, 10 generate a polynomial ring, which contains the square of the generator of degree 15. (Schur 1968, II.9) The ring of covariants is generated by 26 covariants. The ring of invariants is closely related to the moduli space of curves of genus 2, because such a curve can be represented as a double cover of the projective line branched at 6 points, and the 6 points can be taken as the roots of a binary sextic.

=== Covariants of a binary septic ===
The ring of invariants of binary septics is anomalous and has caused several published errors. Cayley claimed incorrectly that the ring of invariants is not finitely generated. Sylvester & Franklin (1879) gave lower bounds of 26 and 124 for the number of generators of the ring of invariants and the ring of covariants and observed that an unproved "fundamental postulate" would imply that equality holds. However von Gall (1888) showed that Sylvester's numbers are not equal to the numbers of generators, which are 30 for the ring of invariants and at least 130 for the ring of covariants, so Sylvester's fundamental postulate is wrong. von Gall (1888) and Dixmier & Lazard (1988) showed that the algebra of invariants of a degree 7 form is generated by a set with 1 invariant of degree 4, 3 of degree 8, 6 of degree 12, 4 of degree 14, 2 of degree 16, 9 of degree 18, and one of each of the degrees 20, 22, 26, 30. Cröni (2002) gives 147 generators for the ring of covariants.

=== Covariants of a binary octavic ===
Sylvester & Franklin (1879) showed that the ring of invariants of a degree 8 form is generated by 9 invariants of degrees 2, 3, 4, 5, 6, 7, 8, 9, 10, and the ring of covariants is generated by 69 covariants. August von Gall (von Gall (1880)) and Shioda (1967) confirmed the generators for the ring of invariants and showed that the ideal of relations between them is generated by elements of degrees 16, 17, 18, 19, 20.

=== Covariants of a binary nonic ===
Brouwer & Popoviciu (2010a) showed that the algebra of invariants of a degree 9 form is generated by 92 invariants. Cröni, Hagedorn, and Brouwer computed 476 covariants, and Lercier & Olive showed that this list is complete.

=== Covariants of a binary decimic ===
Sylvester stated that the ring of invariants of binary decics is generated by 104 invariants the ring of covariants by 475 covariants; his list is to be correct for degrees up to 16 but wrong for higher degrees. Brouwer & Popoviciu (2010b) showed that the algebra of invariants of a degree 10 form is generated by 106 invariants. Hagedorn and Brouwer computed 510 covariants, and Lercier & Olive showed that this list is complete.

=== Covariants of a binary undecimic ===
The ring of invariants of binary forms of degree 11 is complicated and has not yet been described explicitly.

=== Covariants of a binary duodecimic ===
For forms of degree 12 Sylvester (1881) found that in degrees up to 14 there are 109 basic invariants. There are at least 4 more in higher degrees. The number of basic covariants is at least 989.

The number of generators for invariants and covariants of binary forms can be found in (sequence A036983 in the OEIS) and (sequence A036984 in the OEIS), respectively.

== Invariants of several binary forms ==
The covariants of a binary form are essentially the same as joint invariants of a binary form and a binary linear form. More generally, on can ask for the joint invariants (and covariants) of any collection of binary forms. Some cases that have been studied are listed below.

(basic invariant, basic covariant)
Degree of forms	1	2	3	4	5
1	(1, 3)	(2, 5)	(4, 13)	(5, 20)	(23, 94)
2		(3, 6)	(5, 15)	(6, 18)	(29, 92)
3				(20, 63)	(8, 28)
4					

Notes:

- The basic invariants of a linear form are essentially the same as its basic covariants.
- For two quartics, there are 8 basic invariants (3 of degree 2, 4 of degree 3, and 1 of degree 4) and 28 basic covariants. (Gordan gave 30 covariants, but Sylvester showed that two of these are reducible.)

Multiple forms:

- Covariants of several linear forms: The ring of invariants of $n$ linear forms is generated by $n(n-1)/2$ invariants of degree 2. The ring of covariants of $n$ linear forms is essentially the same as the ring of invariants of $n+1$ linear forms.
- Covariants of several linear and quadratic forms:
  - The ring of invariants of a sum of $m$ linear forms and $n$ quadratic forms is generated by $m(m-1)/2 + n(n+1)/2$ generators in degree 2, $nm(m+1)/2 + n(n-1)(n-2)/6$ in degree 3, and $m(m+1)n(n-1)/4$ in degree 4.
  - For the number of generators of the ring of covariants, change $m$ to $m+1$.
- Covariants of many cubics or quartics: See Young (1898).

== See also ==
- Ternary cubic
- Ternary quartic
