= Cayleyan =

In algebraic geometry, the Cayleyan is a variety associated to a hypersurface by Arthur Cayley (1844), who named it the pippian in (Cayley 1857) and also called it the Steiner–Hessian.

== See also ==
- Quippian
