= Perpetuant =

In mathematical invariant theory, a perpetuant is informally an irreducible covariant of a form or infinite degree. More precisely, the dimension of the space of irreducible covariants of given degree and weight for a binary form stabilizes provided the degree of the form is larger than the weight of the covariant, and the elements of this space are called perpetuants. Perpetuants were introduced and named by Sylvester (1882, p.105). MacMahon (1884, 1885, 1894) and Stroh (1890) classified the perpetuants. Elliott (1907) describes the early history of perpetuants and gives an annotated bibliography.

MacMahon conjectured and Stroh proved that the dimension of the space of perpetuants of degree n>2 and weight w is the coefficient of x^{w} of

$$\frac{x^{2^{n-1}-1}}{(1-x^2)(1-x^3)\cdots(1-x^n)}$$

For n=1 there is just one perpetuant, of weight 0, and for n=2 the number is given by the coefficient of x^{w} of x^{2}/(1-x^{2}).

There are very few papers after about 1910 discussing perpetuants; Littlewood is one of the few exceptions. (Kraft & Procesi 2020) exhibited an explicit base of the space of perpetuants.
