= Catalecticant =

Concept in mathematical invariant theory

But the catalecticant of the biquadratic function of x, y was first brought into notice as an invariant by Mr Boole; and the discriminant of the quadratic function of x, y is identical with its catalecticant, as also with its Hessian. Meicatalecticizant would more completely express the meaning of that which, for the sake of brevity, I denominate the catalecticant.

— Sylvester (1852), quoted by Miller (2010)

In mathematical invariant theory, the catalecticant of a form of even degree is a polynomial in its coefficients that vanishes when the form is a sum of an unusually small number of powers of linear forms. It was introduced by Sylvester (1852); see Miller (2010). The word catalectic refers to an incomplete line of verse, lacking a syllable at the end or ending with an incomplete foot.

== Binary forms ==
The catalecticant of a binary form of degree 2n is a polynomial in its coefficients that vanishes when the binary form is a sum of at most n powers of linear forms (Sturmfels 1993).

The catalecticant of a binary form can be given as the determinant of a catalecticant matrix (Eisenbud 1988), also called a Hankel matrix, that is a square matrix with constant (positive sloping) skew-diagonals, such as

$$\begin{bmatrix}
a & b & c & d & e \\
b & c & d & e & f \\
c & d & e & f & g \\
d & e & f & g & h \\
e & f & g & h & i
\end{bmatrix}.$$

== Catalecticants of quartic forms ==
The catalecticant of a quartic form is the resultant of its second partial derivatives. For binary quartics the catalecticant vanishes when the form is a sum of two 4th powers. For a ternary quartic the catalecticant vanishes when the form is a sum of five 4th powers. For quaternary quartics the catalecticant vanishes when the form is a sum of nine 4th powers. For quinary quartics the catalecticant vanishes when the form is a sum of fourteen 4th powers. (Elliott 1913, p. 295)
