= Gubler =

Gubler may refer to:

- Adolphe-Marie Gubler (1821–1879), French physician and pharmacologist
  - Millard–Gubler syndrome
- Daniela Gubler (born 1994), Swiss long jumper
- Eduard Gubler (1891–1971), Swiss painter
- Matthew Gray Gubler (born 1980), American actor and fashion model
- Max Gubler (1898–1973), Swiss artist
- Nellie Gubler (1908–2007), Mormon historian
- Salomon Eduard Gubler (1845–1921), Swiss mathematician

== See also ==
- Gubleria, a synonym of the Chilean bell flower Nolana
- Guler (disambiguation)
