= Christian Moser =

Christian Moser may refer to:

- Christian Moser (ski jumper) (born 1972), Austrian ski jumper
- Christian Moser (mathematician) (1861–1935), Swiss actuary and mathematician
- Christian Moser (politician) (born 1989), German politician
