= Ludwig Schläfli =

Swiss geometer (1814–1895)

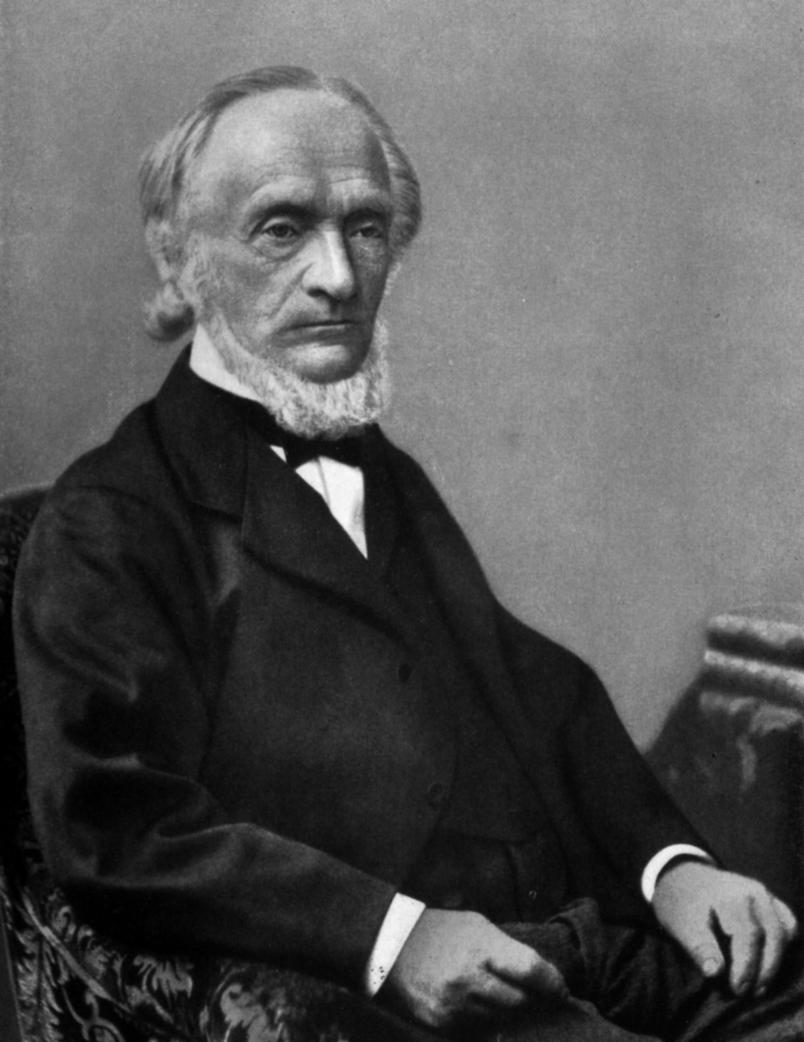
- Born: 15 January 1814; Grasswil (now part of Seeberg), Canton Bern, Switzerland
- Died: 20 March 1895 (aged 81); Bern, Switzerland
- Known for: Regular polytopes; Schläfli double six; Schläfli graph; Schläfli orthoscheme; Schläfli symbol
- Scientific career
- Fields: Mathematics
- Doctoral students: Fritz Bützberger; Carl Friedrich Geiser; Johann Heinrich Graf; Elizaveta Litvinova; Christian Moser
- Other notable students: Salomon Eduard Gubler

Ludwig Schläfli (Swiss Standard German pronunciation: [ˈluːdvɪɡ ˈʃlɛːfli]; 15 January 1814 – 20 March 1895) was a Swiss mathematician, specialising in geometry and complex analysis (at the time called function theory) who was one of the key figures in developing the notion of higher-dimensional spaces.

== Early life and education ==
Schläfli spent most of his life in Switzerland. He was born in Grasswil (now part of Seeberg), his mother's hometown, and moved to nearby Burgdorf as a child. His clumsiness soon showed that he would not follow his father into tradework.

Instead, he entered the gymnasium in Bern in 1829, at age 15, already deep into study of mathematics by way of a calculus text, Abraham Gotthelf Kästner's Mathematische Anfangsgründe der Analysis des Unendlichen. In 1831 he entered the Akademie in Bern to study theology. By 1834 the Akademie had become the new Universität Bern, and he continued there as a student. He graduated in 1836.

=== Career and later life ===
Schläfli became a schoolteacher in Thun, where he worked from 1836 until 1847. He continued his studies in mathematics during this period, including weekly visits to the university. After meeting Jakob Steiner there in 1843, and impressing Steiner with his linguistic skills, he traveled with Steiner and Peter Gustav Lejeune Dirichlet for a six-month visit to Italy, acting as the interpreter for the other two.

In 1847, Schläfli left his teaching position for lower-paid work as a privatdozent at the University of Bern. He was promoted to extraordinary professor in 1853, and to ordinary professor in 1868. After illness hampered his teaching, he retired in 1891, and died on 20 March 1895.

== Research ==
Schläfli did pioneering research in the geometry of spaces of more than three dimensions, recorded in a treatise Theorie der vielfachen Kontinuität that he wrote between 1850 and 1852. This work, rejected both by the Austrian Academy of Sciences and by the Berlin Academy of Science, first appeared in publication in full in 1901, after Schläfli's death. Only then was its importance recognized, for instance by Pieter Hendrik Schoute, who wrote that "This treatise surpasses in scientific value a good portion of everything that has been published up to the present day in the field of multidimensional geometry." In his Theorie, Schläfli identified and classified the regular polytopes of all higher-dimensional Euclidean spaces, and classified them using a notation still in wide used, the Schläfli symbol. He described and provided constructions for the six regular convex 4-polytopes, the dimensional analogues of the five Platonic solids. Among these he discovered the unique 24-cell, 600-cell and 120-cell, the 4-dimensional analogues of the cuboctahedron, icosahedron and dodecahedron respectively, as well as the analogues of the tetrahedron, octahedron and cube which occur in all dimensions.

At around the same time, he clarified the formulation of three-dimensional spherical geometry by observing that it could be interpreted as the geometry of a hypersphere in four-dimensional space. The Schläfli functions, giving the volume of a spherical or Euclidean simplex in terms of its dihedral angles, and the Schläfli orthoscheme, a special simplex with a path of right-angled dihedrals, come from Schläfli's work on higher dimensions.

Schläfli's other later research featured (for example) the discovery of the Schläfli double six from Cayley's 27 lines on a cubic surface, a series of papers on special functions, work on the modular group prefiguring later discoveries of Dirichlet, and work on Weber modular functions and class field theory prefiguring later discoveries of Heinrich Martin Weber.

== Recognition ==
Despite the lack of recognition of Schläfli within his own lifetime for his groundbreaking work on higher dimensions, he was noted for some of his other works. The University of Bern gave him an honorary doctorate in 1863. His work on the Schläfli double six won him the 1870 Steiner Prize of the Berlin Academy, and he was elected to the Istituto Lombardo Accademia di Scienze e Lettere in 1868, the Göttingen Academy of Sciences and Humanities in 1871, and the Accademia dei Lincei in 1883.
