= Max Gubler =

Swiss painter (1898–1973)

- Born: 26 May 1898; Zurich, Switzerland
- Died: 29 July 1973 (aged 75); Zurich, Switzerland
- Occupation: Painter
- Known for: Landscapes, still lifes, figure paintings, portraits
- Movement: Expressionism, New Objectivity
- Spouse: Maria Gronenschild
- Relatives: Eduard Gubler, Ernst Gubler

Max Gubler (26 May 1898 – 29 July 1973) was a Swiss painter whose work was associated with Expressionism and New Objectivity. Born in Zurich into a family of artists, Gubler had two older brothers who also became painters. He has been described as one of the most important Swiss painters of the 20th century. He represented Switzerland at the Venice Biennale in 1952, received the City of Zurich Art Prize in 1959, and was the subject of retrospectives including at the Kunsthaus Zürich and the Museum zu Allerheiligen in Schaffhausen.

== Biography ==
Max Gubler was born in Zurich on 26 May 1898. His father, Heinrich Eduard Gubler, worked as a decorative painter and restorer, and gave him practical training. His older brothers Eduard Gubler and Ernst Gubler also became artists.

Gubler attended the teacher training college in Küsnacht from 1914 to 1918, but did not complete the course. He also studied at the Zeichenschule Rheingold and the Kunstgewerbeschule Zürich. Around 1914, he met the art dealer and collector Han Coray, whose purchases helped him support himself as an artist from 1919 to 1929. From 1916, Gubler became part of artistic and literary circles in Zurich, including artists associated with Dada. Through his friendship with Else Lasker-Schüler, the Berlin art dealer Paul Cassirer became aware of his work.

Gubler first travelled to Florence in 1920. He returned there in 1923, and then lived and worked intermittently on the island of Lipari until 1928. He married Maria Gronenschild in 1927.

From 1930 to 1937, Gubler lived in Paris. From January 1932 to summer 1937, he had a studio in Montrouge. During this period, he held a Swiss federal art scholarship from 1932 to 1934. In 1937, he moved into his own studio house in Unterengstringen, near Fahr Convent.

In 1957, Gubler developed a serious heart condition, and his work became increasingly limited. From 1958, he spent long periods in clinics, first in Kreuzlingen and then in Préfargier. After his wife’s death in 1961, he no longer painted. In 1969, he moved to the Burghölzli clinic in Zurich, where he died on 29 July 1973.

== Work ==
Gubler’s early work was associated with Expressionism and later moved towards New Objectivity. During his years in Lipari, he painted figures and landscapes marked by brighter light, softer colour and freer brushwork. By the late 1920s, black outlines became more prominent in his work, and he gave more attention to composition and surface.

Gubler painted landscapes, still lifes, figure paintings, multi-figure compositions and self-portraits. He often painted the same subjects more than once as he developed his style. After moving to Unterengstringen, near Zurich, in 1937, he often painted places near his studio above the Limmat River. These included the Schlieren gasworks and Fahr Convent.

Between 1937 and 1950, Gubler frequently developed pictures in series, especially self-portraits, standing female figures and landscapes around Fahr Convent. These serial works were not simple variations, but attempts to give greater precision to a chosen theme. By the mid-1940s, his colours intensified and his handling of form became more expressive. After a 1949 trip to Venice, he painted a series of Venice landscapes. These works marked a further shift, as the depicted objects became harder to read and colour and form suggested the subject rather than describing it directly. From 1953 to 1957, Gubler made hundreds of coloured drawings related to Ernest Hemingway’s novella The Old Man and the Sea.

After his illness began in 1957, Gubler continued to paint and draw for several years. Around 400 works from this late period remained out of public view for decades.

== Exhibitions and recognition ==
Gubler held his first solo exhibition at Galerie Aktuaryus in Zurich in 1932. In 1938, he received a prize from the Conrad Ferdinand Meyer Foundation. In 1942, the Kunstmuseum Solothurn presented his most extensive solo exhibition to that date. He represented Switzerland at the Venice Biennale in 1952, together with Jakob Probst and Hans Fischer. A retrospective of his work was held at the Kunsthaus Zürich in 1952–1953, and he received the City of Zurich Art Prize in 1959.

Later exhibitions included a 1962 retrospective at the Museum zu Allerheiligen in Schaffhausen, a 1969 exhibition at the Kunstmuseum Bern and a 1975 retrospective at the Kunsthaus Zürich. In 2014, the Museum zu Allerheiligen presented a selection of Gubler’s late work, bringing renewed attention to this previously little-seen part of his oeuvre. The exhibition focused on works made between 1957 and 1961 and was accompanied by a book on the late work.

== Collections ==
Works by Gubler are held by institutions including the Aargauer Kunsthaus, Kunstmuseum Basel, Kunstmuseum Bern, the Musée d’art et d’histoire in Geneva, the Museum zu Allerheiligen in Schaffhausen, Kunstmuseum Solothurn, Kunst Museum Winterthur, the Graphische Sammlung ETH and Kunsthaus Zürich.
