= Johann Heinrich Graf =

Swiss mathematician

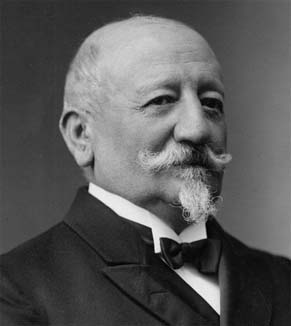
- Born: 16 August 1852; Töss (Winterthur), Switzerland
- Died: 17 June 1918 (aged 65); Bern, Switzerland
- Education: ETH Zurich; University of Bern
- Spouse(s): Anna Luisa Däniker (1874- ) Maria Magdalena Balli (1898- )
- Scientific career
- Fields: Mathematics
- Workplaces: University of Bern
- Thesis: Beiträge zur Theorie der Riemann'schen Fläche (1878)
- Doctoral advisor: Ludwig Schläfli

Johann Heinrich Graf (16 August 1852 – 17 June 1918) was a Swiss mathematician who was rector of the University of Bern and promoter of the Swiss National Library.

== Life and work ==
Graf, son of a policeman, studied at Polytechnicum of Zurich where he graduated in science in 1874. Once graduated, he became a secondary school teacher in Bern, while He did the doctorate studies supervised by Ludwig Schläfli. He received his doctorate in 1877 and the following year he was named assistant professor at the Berne University in which he remained until his death. In 1892, when Schläfli retired, he held his chair.

Aside from his research and teaching duties at the university, Graf exercised numerous administrative responsibilities: he was dean and rector of the university, he was councilor of the city of Bern, he was editor of the magazine of the society of natural sciences (Naturforschende Gesellschaft), secretary of the Central Commission of National Geography and, from 1895 to 1918, he chaired the Swiss Library Commission, a post from which he promoted the creation of the National Library of Switzerland (Schweizerische Landesbibliothek).

Graf's mathematical work focuses on the Bessel functions, a topic about he published a book with Salomon Eduard Gubler, published in two volumes appeared in 1898 and 1900. He also wrote other works about geometry or geodesy.

== Bibliography ==
- Neuenschwander, Erwin (2002). "Switzerland". In Joseph W. Dauben; Christoph J. Scriba (eds.). Writing the History of Mathematics: Its Historical Development. Birkhäuser. pp. 97–106. ISBN 3-7643-6166-2.
