= Elizaveta Litvinova =

Russian woman mathematician (1845–1919?)

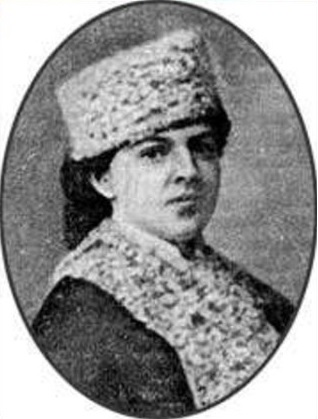

Elizaveta Fedorovna Litvinova (1845–1919?) was a Russian mathematician and pedagogue. She is the author of over 70 articles about mathematics education.

== Early life and education ==
Born in 1845 in czarist Russia as Elizaveta Fedorovna Ivashkina, she completed her early education at a women's high school in Saint Petersburg. In 1866 Elizaveta married Viktor Litvinov, who, unlike Vladimir Kovalevsky (Sofia Kovalevskaya's husband), would not allow her to travel to Europe to study at the universities there. Thus, Litvinova started to study with Strannoliubskii, who had also privately tutored Kovalevskaya.

In 1872, as soon as her husband died, Litvinova went to Zürich and enrolled at a polytechnic institute. In 1873 the Russian czar decreed all Russian women studying in Zürich had to return to Russia or face the consequences. Litvinova was one of the few to ignore the decree and she remained to continue her studies, earning her baccalaureate in Zürich in 1876. She completed her doctoral degree in 1878 from the University of Bern, as a student of Ludwig Schläfli, becoming the first woman to earn a doctorate in mathematics in Switzerland.

== Career and later life ==
When Litvinova returned to Russia, she was denied university appointments because she had defied the 1873 recall. She taught at a women's high school and supplemented her meager income by writing biographies of more famous mathematicians such as Kovalevskaya and Aristotle. After retiring, Litvinova moved to the countryside in 1917. Although no subsequent records have been found, it is believed that she must have died soon after, possibly in the Russian famine of 1921–1922 or earlier.
