= Auguste Louis Jules Millard =

French physician (1830–1915)

Auguste Louis Jules Millard (30 April 1830 in Paris – 13 November 1915 in Paris) was a French physician.

He studied medicine in Paris, where in 1860 he attained the title of médecin des hôpitaux. He subsequently worked at the Hôpital des Enfants-Malades, Hôpital Saint-Antoine and the Hôpital Lariboisière. From 1877 until 1895, he was associated with the Hôpital Beaujon in Paris. In 1854 he became a member of the Société anatomique de Paris (honorary member from 1866).

In 1855 he identified a disorder characterized by unilateral softening of the brain caused by obstruction of the blood vessels of the pons. The condition was to become known as "Millard–Gubler syndrome", named in conjunction with Adolphe-Marie Gubler, who described the syndrome in a paper published in 1856.

== Selected writings ==
- De la trachéotomie dans le cas de croup (1858, dissertation thesis) – On tracheotomy involving a case of croup.
- Rapport sur un cas d'anévrysme de l'aorte thoracique communiquant avec l'oesophage (1862) – On a thoracic aorta aneurysm associated with the esophagus.
