= Münster Schaffhausen =

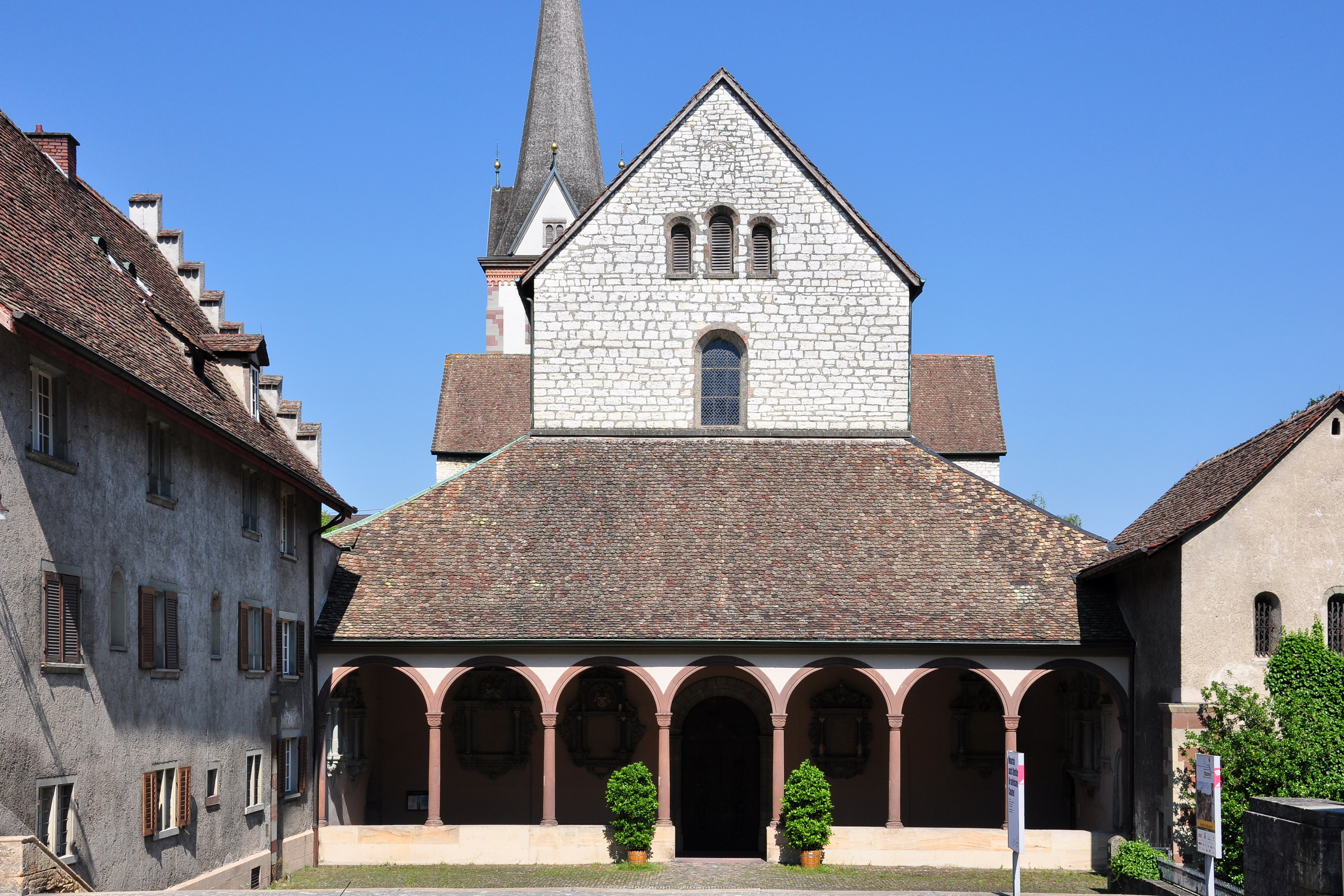
- Entrance of Münster Schaffhausen and the Kloster Allerheiligen

Religion
- Affiliation: Reformed
- District: Evangelical Reformed Church of the Canton of Schaffhausen

Location
- Location: Schaffhausen; Switzerland
- Interactive map of Münster Schaffhausen
- Coordinates: 47°41′41.63″N 8°38′12.3″E

Architecture
- Type: Basilica
- Style: Romanesque Architecture, Gothic Revival
- Founder: Eberhard von Nellenburg
- Established: 22 November 1049; 976 years ago
- Groundbreaking: 1049
- Completed: 1064; 962 years ago
- Direction of façade: west

Website
- Official website (in German)

Münster is one of the two main churches of the old town of the Swiss city of Schaffhausen. First built in 1064 AD as a Romanesque Basilica of the then Benedictine Kloster Allerheiligen, it was rebuilt several times, and became in 1524 the Reformed Church of the city of Schaffhausen.

== Geography ==
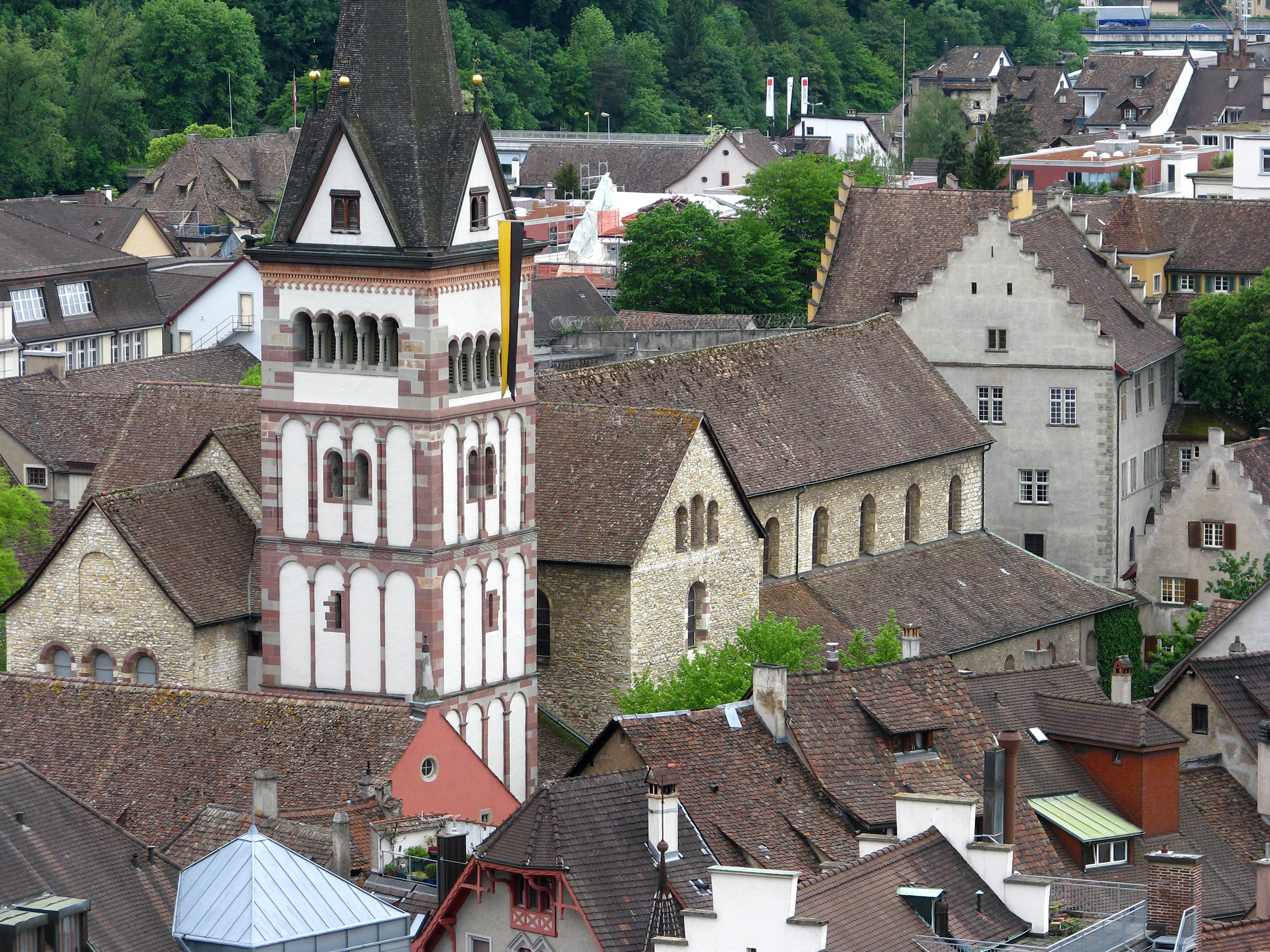
Münster as seen from the Munot hill

Today the Reformed church is as before architecturally integrated in the vast complex of the former Allerheiligen abbey, and is located at the center of the historic old city of the municipality of Schaffhausen in the Canton of Schaffhausen.

== History ==
The development of the city of Schaffhausen is closely linked to the Nellenburg noble family around 1100 AD. Various archaeological finds and the building of the present church date back to around 1000 AD. The Earls (German: Grafen) von Nellenburg recognized the importance of the geographical area as a transshipment of goods on the Rhine river, and the order to bypass the Rheinfall waterfalls, controlled by the Wörth Castle. The Allerheiligen Abbey and the Basilica were founded by Eberhard von Nellenburg in 1049, on 22 November it was consecrated by Pope Leo IX, and in 1064 the construction works were completed. The church was dedicated to the Saviour, the Holy Cross, the Virgin Mary and All the Saints. Allerheiligen became, instead of the Reichenau Abbey, the new grave lay by the founding family, and various renovations and additions. Eberhard became after 1075 a Benedictine monk in the abbey, and died there in 1078 or 1079. He was buried in the outdoor crypt that was built for the family.

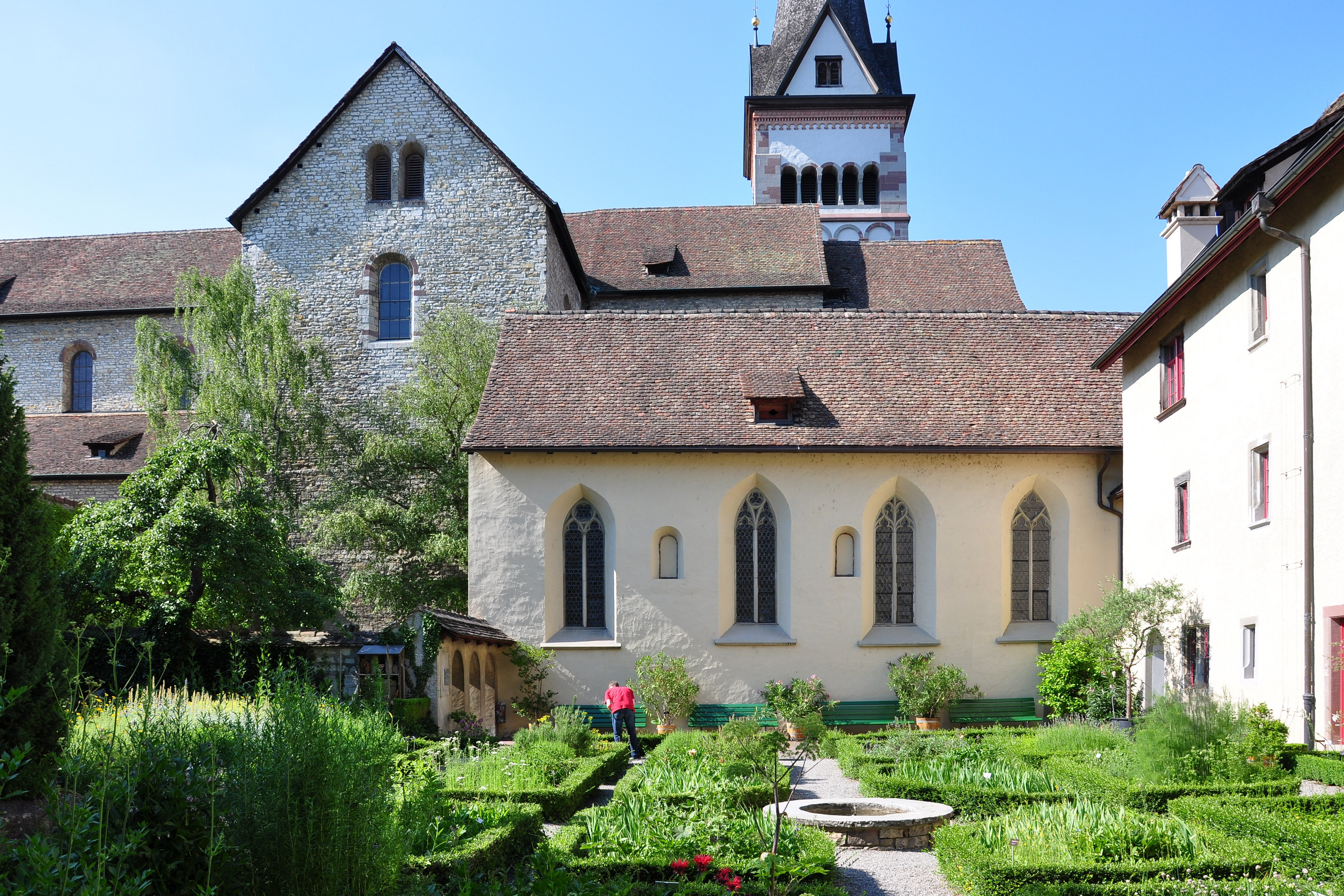
the former monastery's garden, as of today a herbal garden

In the so-called Investiture Controversy conflict between the Roman Catholic church in Rome and the secular power, the pope loyal Count Burkhard von Nellenburg, the son and heir of Eberhard, conformed in 1080 all of the rights of the monastery. The monastery was directly subordinate to the Pope, and received the vast estate of the family, the free election of the abbot, and the mint money market as well as the town of Schaffhausen. Thus abbot became the new lord of the city. Burkhard remained the monastery's Vogt, and motivated the Abbot William to join with some monks from the Hirsau Abbey, to reform the monastery on the model of Hirsau. After more than four centuries of economic and political decline, Michael Eggendorfer, the last abbot of the monastery, initiated the last renovations in 1521/22. During the Reformation in Switzerland, the abbey was abolished, and the Cathedral became the second main city church in 1524.

== Architecture ==
=== Early years ===
In its early years, the church consisted of a three-aisled Basilica with a three-apsed choir, a transept and a double tower facade to the west. The westerly courtyard was preceded by a single goal, which was flanked by two chapels. About this door system, there was possibly the entrance to the Nellenburg Palatinate, once the residence of the Nellenburg family. The monastery in all was modeled on church's building from Cluny Abbey. Ebernhard von Nellenburg financed the monastery's church third central tower to the west, extended with a new chancel choir grown in the apex outdoor crypt, as a burial chamber, and a subsequent courtyard. Around 1090, the church was partially demolished to make place for a larger Cathedral.

=== Romanesque church ===
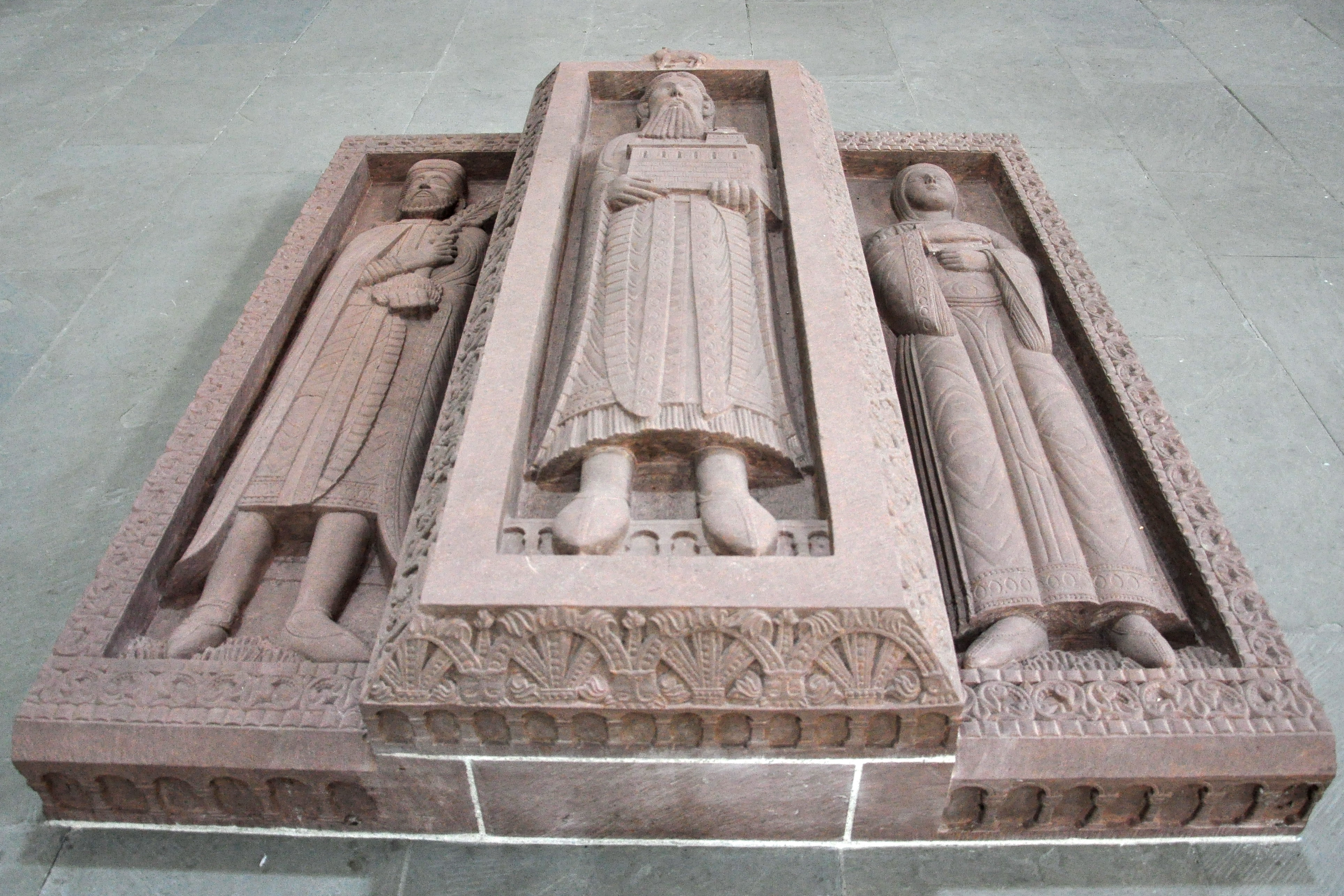
reconstructed grave lay of the Nellenburg family inside the church

Late Romanesque expansions were added between 1150 and 1250. Abbot Ullrich initiated the construction of the cathedral tower. These extensions included the east wing of the convent buildings including the chapter house of the monks on the ground floor, and a dormitory with latrines upstairs. In the west, the monastery gate, a two-storey house for guests and lay brothers were added, as well as the present herb garden, the hospital, the novitiate and a loggia.

The present St. Johann's church was vaulted, and upstairs there was a further chapel added. The ornately decorated semi-circular arched lunettes that were originally on this upper chapel, are among the finest examples of Romanesque architectural sculpture in the monastery, and are on display in the museum. Finally the chapels of St. Michael and Erhards were built, and a Beguine house.

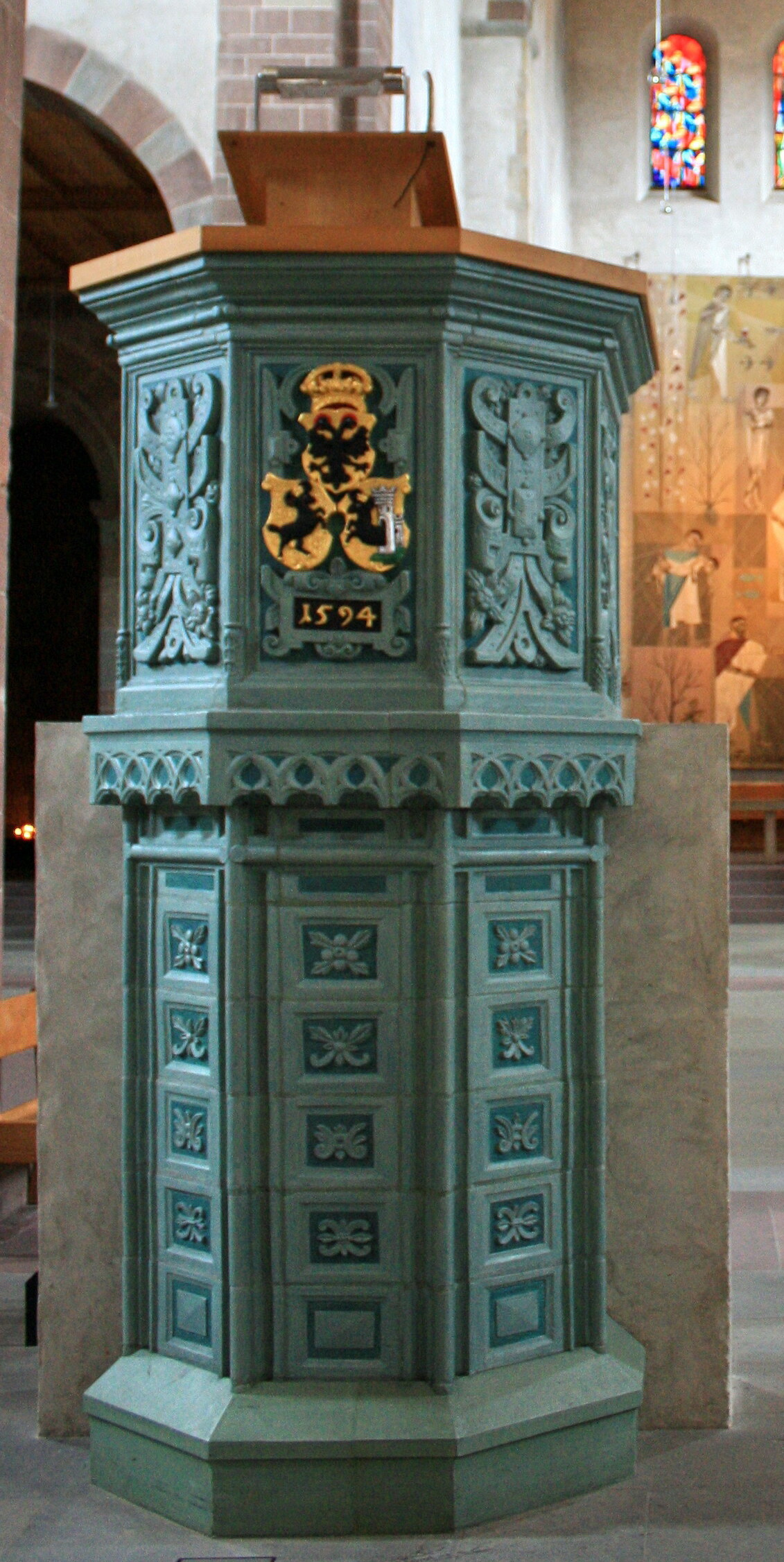
Pulpit in the basilic

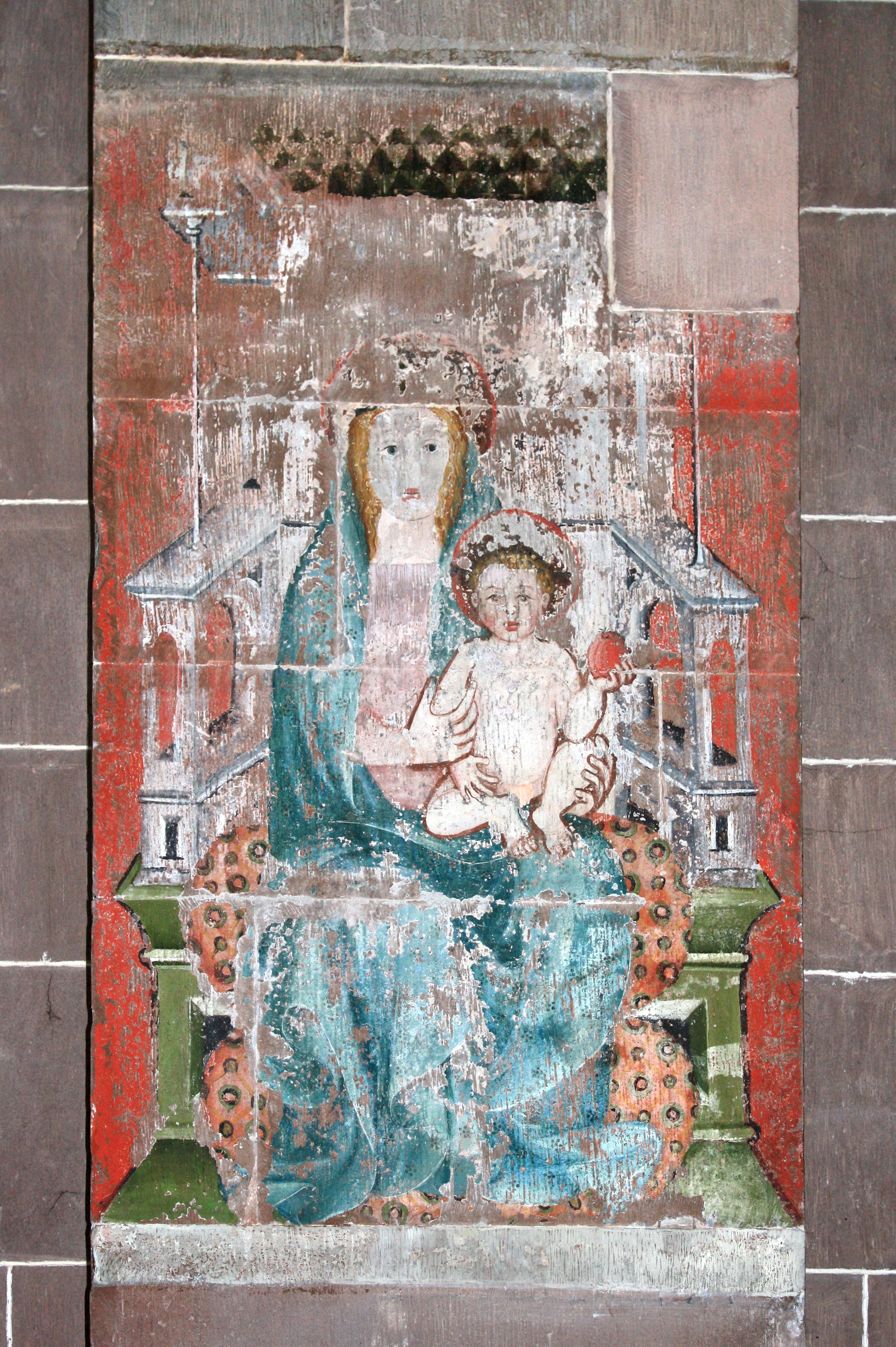
fresco in the basilica

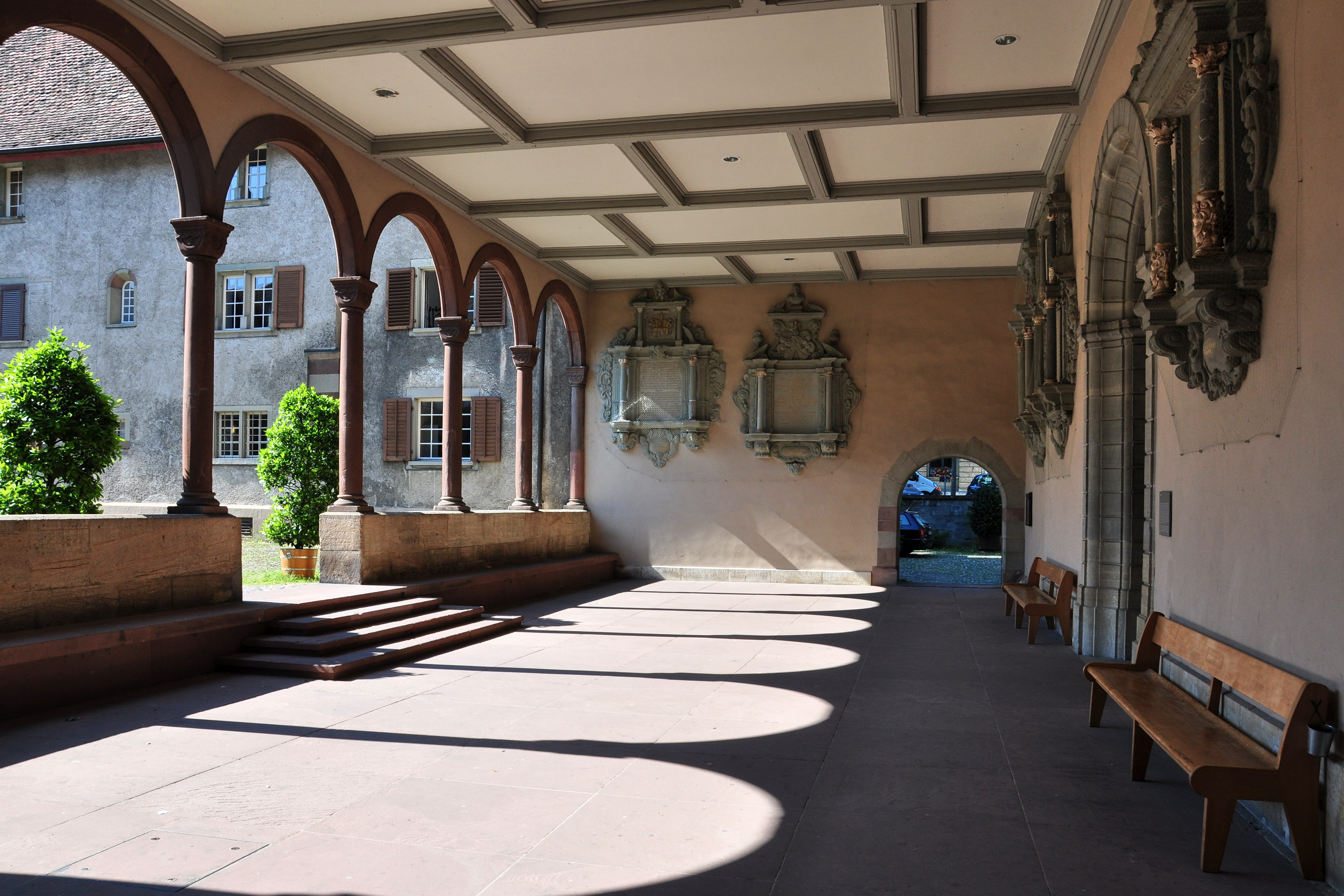
cloister and gravestones

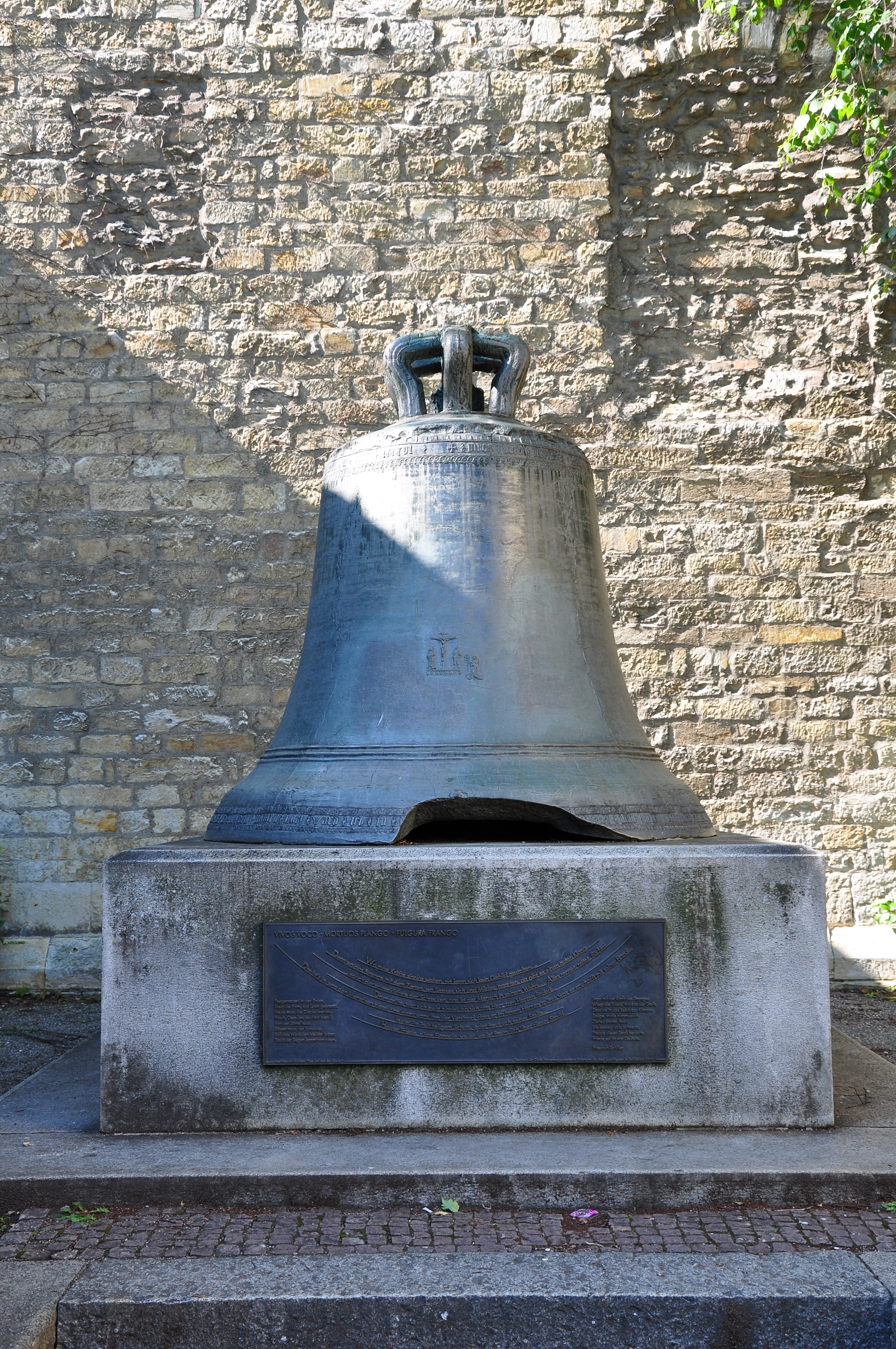
so-called Schillerglocke in the garden

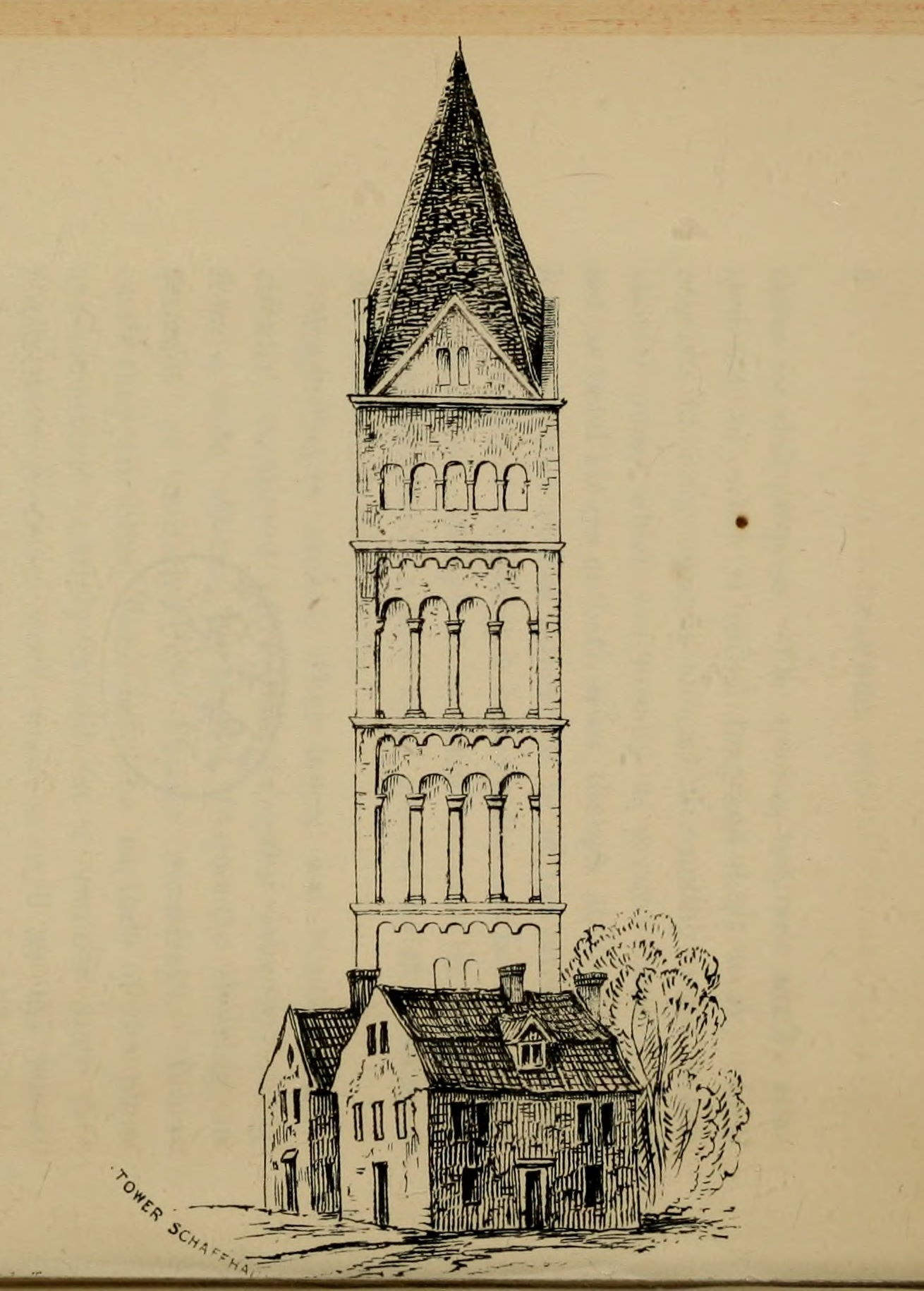
The tower (1851)

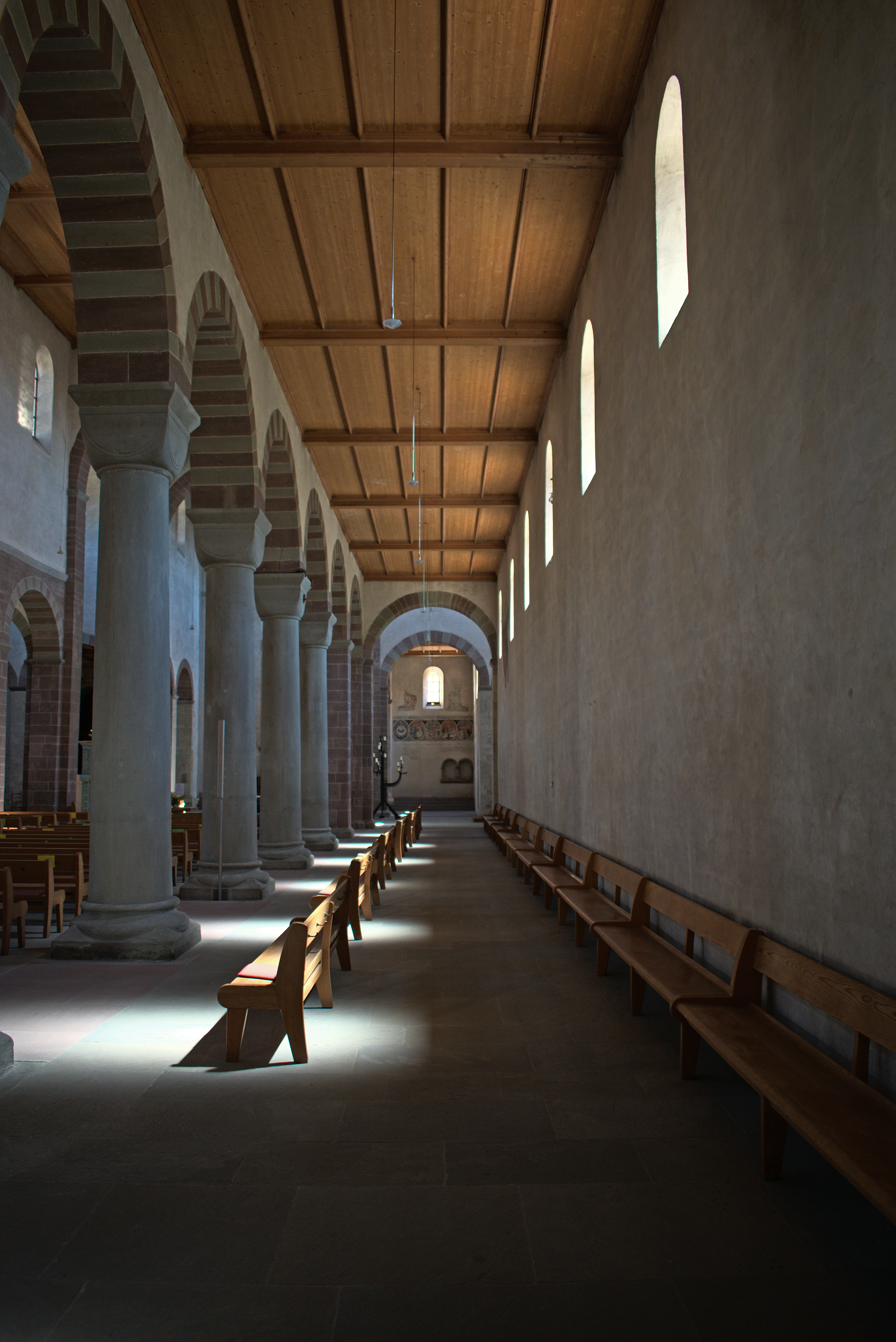
Side nave

The former monastery's building complex are the oldest buildings that still exist in Schaffhausen.

== Pipe organ ==
The first pipe organ from the 15th century AD was a swallow's nest organ hung on the northern high wall of the nave. In 1529 it was canceled in the wake of the Reformation as an unpleasant pope lyra and decoy for anti-Christian Roman worship. In 1597 the city council considers that the organ should be reintroduced, the clergy reacted strongly and secured a sustainable waiver of such attempts. So it was not until the year 1879, to when Johann Nepomuk Kuhn was finally allowed to install a new organ on the westerly gallery. It was a mechanical cone chest organ. The magnificent neogothic housing was built according to the plans of the then known architects and builders Franz Müller und August In 1929 a rather wide drastic remodeling by the builders Kuhn was done.

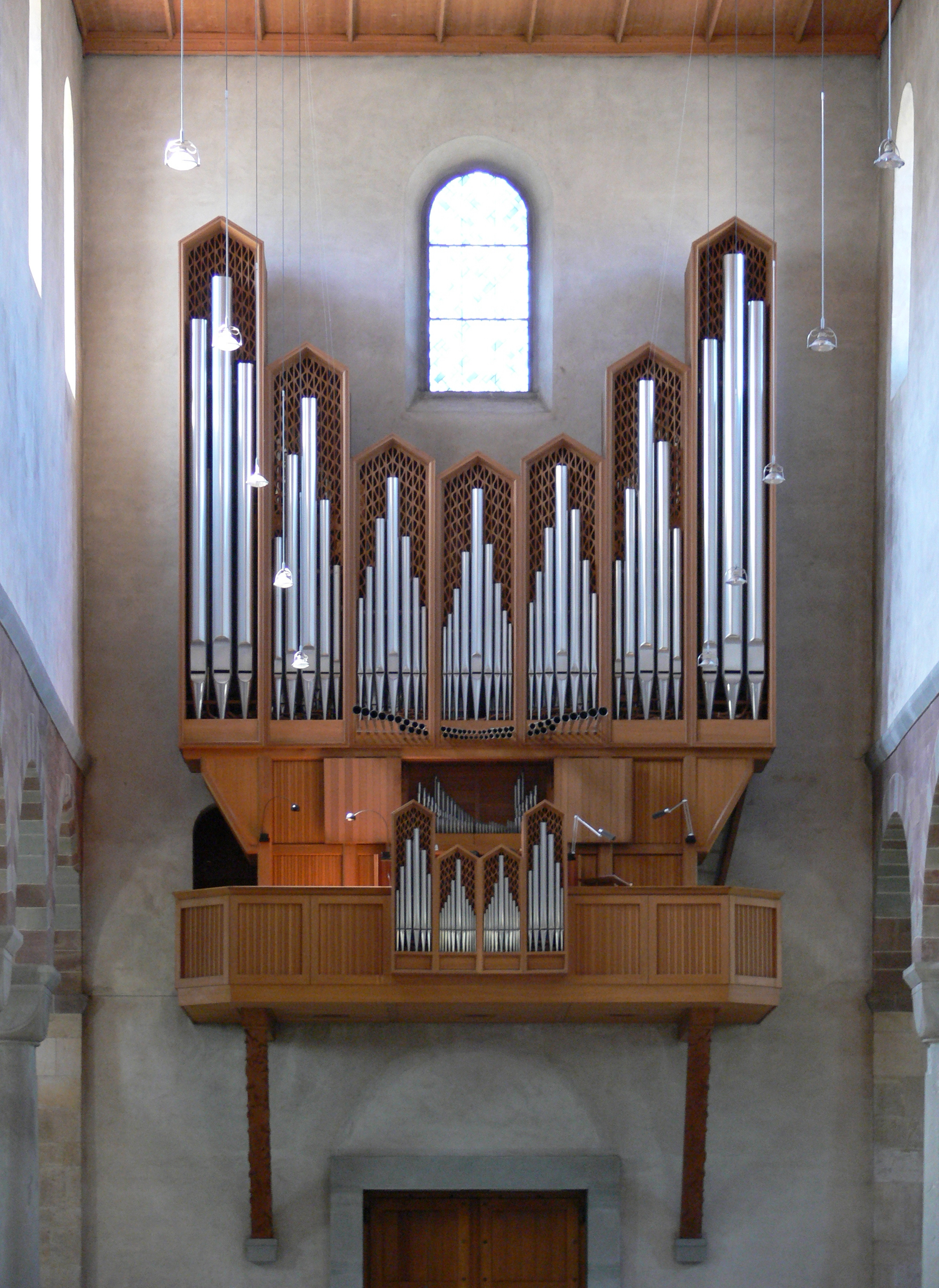

I Manual C–g^{3}

-—

Principal
16′
Bourdon
16′
Principal
8′
Gedeckt
8′
Gamba
8′
Gemshorn
8′
Flauto dolce
8′
Quintflöte
5^{1}/_{3}′
Octav
4′
Fugara
4′
Octav
2′
Mixtur 5f.
5^{1}/_{3}′
Mixtur 4f.
2^{2}/_{3}′
Gross Cornett IV
5^{1}/_{3}′
Tuba
16′
Trompete
8′

II Manual C–g^{3}

-—

Bourdon
16′
Gamba
16′
Principal
8′
Gedeckt 2)
8′
Viola
8′
Spitzflöte
8′
Dolce
8′
Octav
4′
Gemshorn
4′
Traversflöte 2)
4′
Quintflöte
2^{2}/_{3}′
Flautino
2′
Mixtur 4f.
2^{2}/_{3}′
Cornett 3-5f.
8′
Clarinet 2)
8′
Trompete
8′
Tremolo

III Swell C–g^{3}1)

-—

Lieblich Gedeckt
16′
Geigenprincipal
8′
Lieblich Gedeckt
8′
Wienerflöte
8′
Salicional
8′
Aeoline
8′
Voix céleste
8′
Octav
4′
Spitzflöte
4′
Flûte d'amour
4′
Nazard
2^{2}/_{3}′
Octavin
2′
Tierce
1^{3}/_{5}′
Plein-jeu V
2′
Basson
16′
Trompette harm.
8′
Oboe
8′
Vox humana
8′
Tremolo

Pedal C–f^{1}

-—

Principal
32′
Principal
16′
Subbass
16′
Violonbass
16′
Harmonikabass
16′
Octavbass
8′
Flötenbass
8′
Violoncello
8′
Octav
4′
Rohrflöte
4′
Nachthorn
2′
Rauschbass III
5^{1}/_{3}′
Mixtur IV
2^{2}/_{3}′
Posaune
16′
Trompete
8′
Clarino
4′

1 crescendo with 20 steps, paddocks crescendo capture system with 8 x 500 combinations (built in 2003) with a floppy drive. Koppeln: II/I, III/I, III/II, I/P, II/P, III/P – 1) swellable – 2) in separate swell

As part of a total restoration of the church (1979 to 1985), the existing organ was obtained as a monument worthy instrument, but at the same the front panel time pushed back. The I and II Manual have been faithfully restored, originally located at the far end, III Manual (Swell) was then set down a level to the lower case. Also, the laterally placed pedal mechanism had to be recreated on two levels. The instrument again consisted of mechanical cone chests, equipped with the three manuals and modern Barker machines. 51 of the 66 registers are now wholly or partly of the original organ, 4 registers were reconstructed and 11 registers, mostly in the Swell, have been added.

== Parish St. Johann – Münster ==
In 2014 the merger of the parishes Münster and St. Johann was generally supported; the new established parish of St. Johann Schaffhausen Münster comprises over 3,700 members.

== Cultural heritage of national importance ==
The building is listed in the Swiss inventory of cultural property of national and regional significance as a Class A object of national importance.

== Literature ==
- Kurt Bänteli, Hans Peter Mathis: Das ehemalige Kloster zu Allerheiligen in Schaffhausen. Schweizerische Kunstführer GSK Nr. 76, Gesellschaft für Schweizerische Kunstgeschichte, Bern 2004, ISBN
- Kurt Bänteli: Das Kloster Allerheiligen in Schaffhausen. Zum 950. Jahr seiner Gründung am 22. November 1049. Schaffhauser Archäologie, Vol. 4, Schaffhausen 1999, ISBN 3-9521-8680-5.
- Thomas Hildbrand: Herrschaft, Schrift und Gedächtnis. Das Kloster Allerheiligen und sein Umgang mit Wissen in Wirtschaft, Recht und Archiv (11.-16. Jahrhundert). Zürich 1996, ISBN 3-9053-1193-3.
