= Fritz Bützberger =

Swiss mathematician (1862–1922)

- Born: 26 March 1862; Bleienbach, canton of Bern, Switzerland
- Died: 1 November 1922 (aged 60); Bern, Switzerland
- Education: ETH Zurich; University of Bern
- Spouse: Rosa Kohler
- Scientific career
- Fields: Mathematics
- Thesis: Ein mit der Theorie algebraischer Flächen zusammenhängendes planimetrisches Problem (1888)
- Doctoral advisor: Ludwig Schläfli

Fritz Bützberger (26 March 1862 – 1 November 1922) was a Swiss mathematician.

== Life and work ==
Bützberger was educated in the schools of Langenthal and Burgdorf before enrolling at ETH Zürich in 1880. He graduated in 1884 and began his teaching in his former secondary school in Langenthal. Simultaneously he studied for his doctorate that was awarded him by the university of Bern in 1888 under the advice of Ludwig Schläfli.

From 1896 he was mathematics professor at the Kantonsschule of Zürich. He also delivered some lectures on geometry to future teachers in the university of Zürich. From 1903 he had a teaching post in the technical school of Burgdorf.

He was the author of several text books for secondary level very valued and reedited several times. The matters included stereometry, trigonometry, algebra and arithmetic.

He was also the editor of the oldest papers and manuscripts of Jakob Steiner.

In 1896–97, he was on the organizing committee of the first International Congress of Mathematicians in Zürich.

== Bibliography ==
- Bützberger, Fritz (1994). "Fritz Bützberger (1862-1922)" (PDF). ETH Zürich Research Collection. doi:10.3929/ethz-a-000480488.
- Eminger, Stefanie Ursula (2015). Carl Friedrich Geiser and Ferdinand Rudio: The Men Behind the First International Congress of Mathematicians (PDF). St Andrews University.
- Lorenat, Jemma (2015). Die Freude an der Gestalt: Methods, Figures, and Practices in Early Nineteenth Century Geometry (PDF). Simon Fraser University.
