= Millard–Gubler syndrome =

- Other names: Ventral pontine syndrome
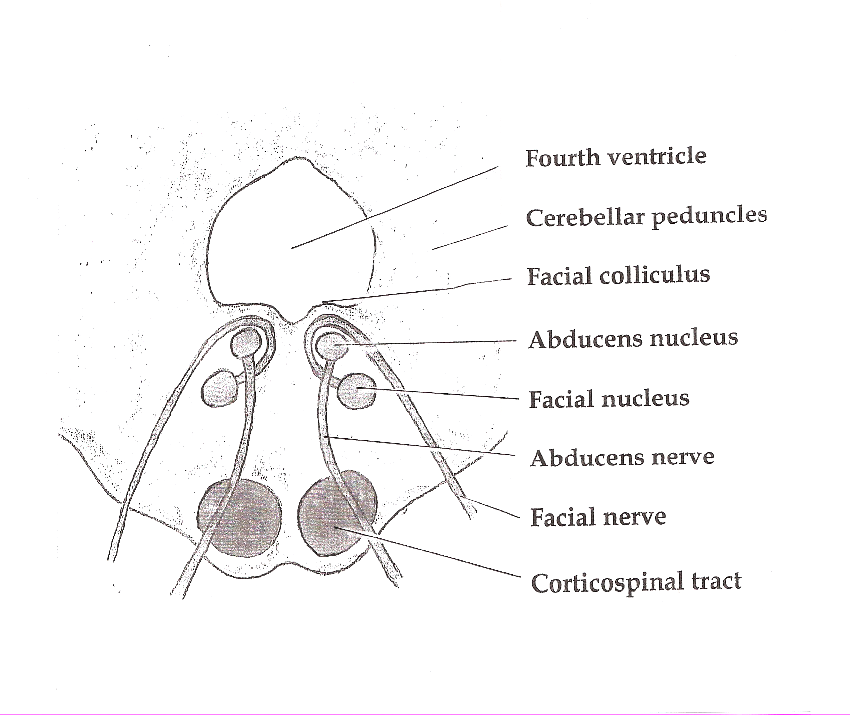
- Pons
- Specialty: Neurology

Millard–Gubler syndrome is a lesion of the pons. It is also called ventral pontine syndrome.

== Presentation ==
Symptoms result from the functional loss of several anatomical structures of the pons, including the sixth and seventh cranial nerves and fibers of the corticospinal tract. Paralysis of the abducens (CN VI) leads to diplopia, internal strabismus (i.e., esotropia), and loss of power to rotate the affected eye outward), and disruption of the facial nerves (CN VII) leads to symptoms including flaccid paralysis of the muscles of facial expression and loss of the corneal reflex. Disruption of the corticospinal tract leads to contralateral hemiplegia of the extremities.

== Diagnosis ==
This syndrome is easier to diagnose today thanks to the technical advances in brain imaging (CT, MRI). It can also be identified based on the symptoms described above.

== Management ==
Antiplatelets

== Eponym ==
Millard–Gubler syndrome is named after two French physicians, Auguste Louis Jules Millard (1830–1915), who first identified the disorder in 1855, and Adolphe-Marie Gubler (1821–1879), who described the disease in a medical paper one year later.

== See also ==
- Cerebral softening
