= Nellie Gubler =

American Mormon genealogist

Nellie McArthur Gubler (born Nellie McArthur; May 8, 1908 – September 28, 2007) was a genealogist and notable citizen of Santa Clara, Utah. She worked to collect materials related to southern Utah history, which has aided in books written about the location. She was given multiple awards due to her contributions to history and research. She was an active member of the Church of Jesus Christ of Latter-day Saints (LDS Church), where she worked with the Primary children's organization. Gubler also published books on the history of Santa Clara, specifically about the LDS church's history there. In 1929, she married Emil Gubler and had 12 children.

== Biography ==
Nellie Gubler was born to Moroni McArthur and Emma Jarvis Cottam on May 8, 1908. She grew up in St. George, Utah, and attended Dixie State College, graduating in 1928. She married Emil Gubler on June 12, 1929, and they had 12 children together.

Gubler spent considerable effort to research and collect materials related to southern Utah history. The book History of Santa Clara, Utah: "A Blossom in the Desert" drew heavily from the photographs and histories she collected and is dedicated to her. The St. George Chamber of Commerce awarded her the Outstanding Senior Woman Award in 1984. She received the Utah State Historical Award in 1991 and various other awards for her history research, including a Swiss embassy plaque for her written history of Swiss emigrants to Southern Utah County. Dixie College awarded her a lifetime of service award in 1998.

Gubler was active in the Church of Jesus Christ of Latter-day Saints and received an award from the church's Primary General Board in 1966 after 27 years of service in the church's children organization. In 1974, she received the Silver Fawn Award from the Utah National Parks Council for her outstanding service to the Boy Scouts of America.

Gubler published The Relief Society Memories Book, a history of the Santa Clara Relief Society from 1868–1956, published in the St. George stake history book. She also wrote a chapter on the history of Santa Clara, Washington County, in Under Dixie Sun.

== Bibliography ==
- Gubler, Nellie (1950). "History of Santa Clara, Washington County". In Bradshaw, Hazel (ed.). Under Dixie Sun. Washington County Chapter Daughters of the Utah Pioneers. OCLC 54498740.
