= Salomon Eduard Gubler =

Swiss mathematician

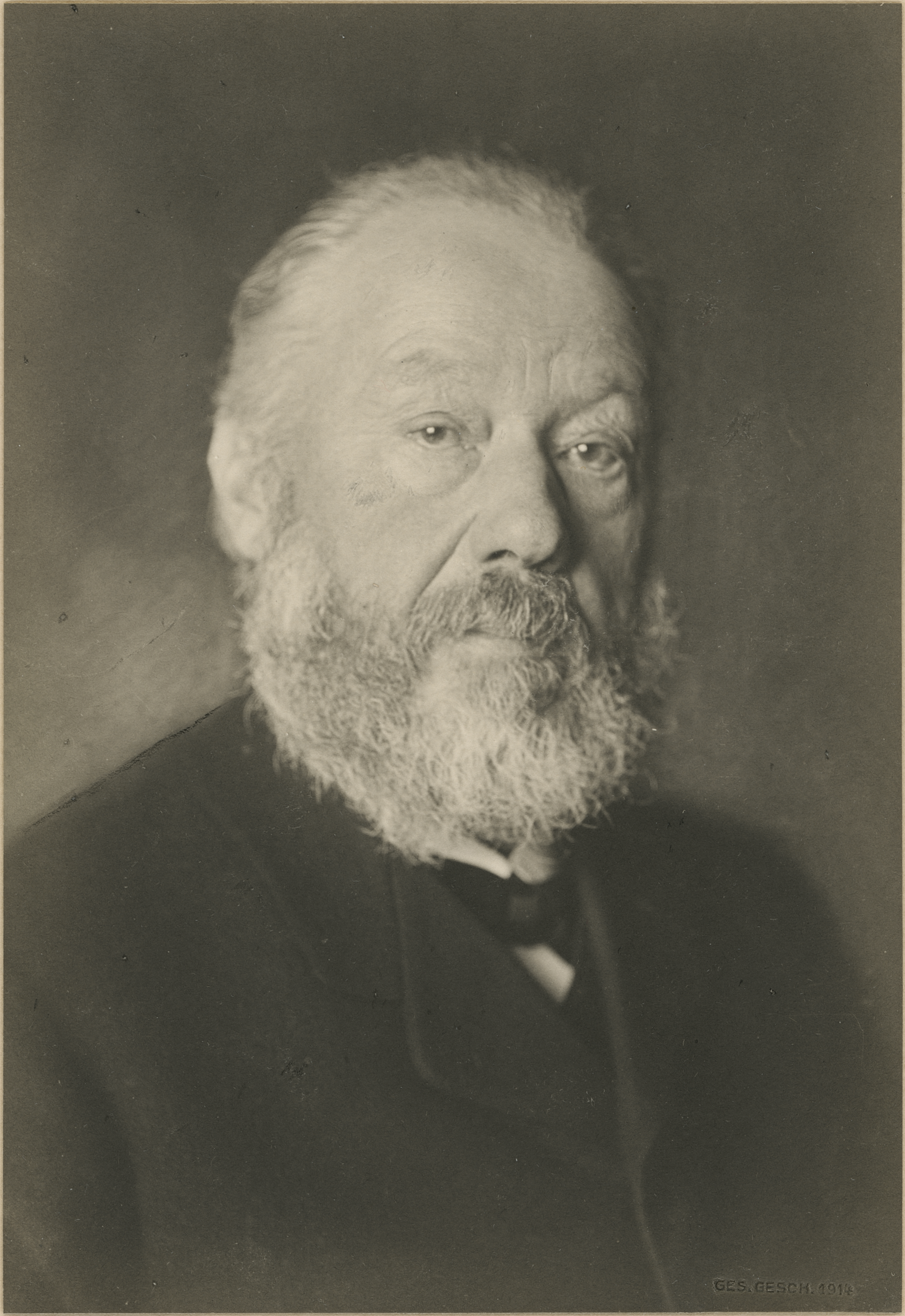
- Born: 7 July 1845; Wila, Switzerland
- Died: 6 November 1921 (aged 76); Zürich, Switzerland
- Education: University of Bern
- Spouse: Elise Margreth Iselin
- Scientific career
- Fields: Mathematics
- Workplaces: Secondary schools in Zürich
- Thesis: Verwandlung einer hypergeometrischen reihe im an das integral $\int_0^\infty J_{(x)}^a e^{-bx} x^{c-1} \, dx$ (1894 published)
- Doctoral advisor: Ludwig Schläfli

Salomon Eduard Gubler (7 July 1845 – 6 November 1921) was a Swiss mathematician. With Johann Heinrich Graf he published Einleitung in Die Theorie Der Bessel'schen Funktionen (A Treatise on the Theory of Bessel Functions) in two volumes (1898–1900). He was the author of very appreciated textbooks on mathematics and numerous reports about the methodology and organization on mathematics teaching, and he was a member of the Swiss commission for the teaching of mathematics and founder of the Swiss association of teachers of mathematics. His main research interest was the Bessel functions.

== Life and work ==
Gubler graduated in the university of Bern in 1870 as Ludwig Schläfli's student. There are no records in the university about his doctoral thesis published in 1894. He spent his academic career in secondary schools, but it seems that he also taught in the University of Zurich. He retired in 1914.

== Bibliography ==
- Eminger, Stefanie (2012). "Viribus unitis! shall be our watchword: the first International Congress of Mathematicians, held 9–11 August 1897 in Zurich". BSHM Bulletin. 27 (3): 155–168. doi:10.1080/17498430.2012.687496. ISSN 1749-8430. S2CID 121968603.
- Eminger, Stefanie Ursula (2015). Carl Friedrich Geiser and Ferdinand Rudio: The Men Behind the First International Congress of Mathematicians (PDF). St Andrews University. hdl:10023/6536.
- Fehr, H. (1921–1922). "Nécrologie Ed. Gubler". L'Enseignement Mathématique (in French). 22: 83. ISSN 0013-8584.
