= Kloster Allerheiligen, Schaffhausen =

Former Benedictine abbey in Schaffhausen

Kloster Allerheiligen
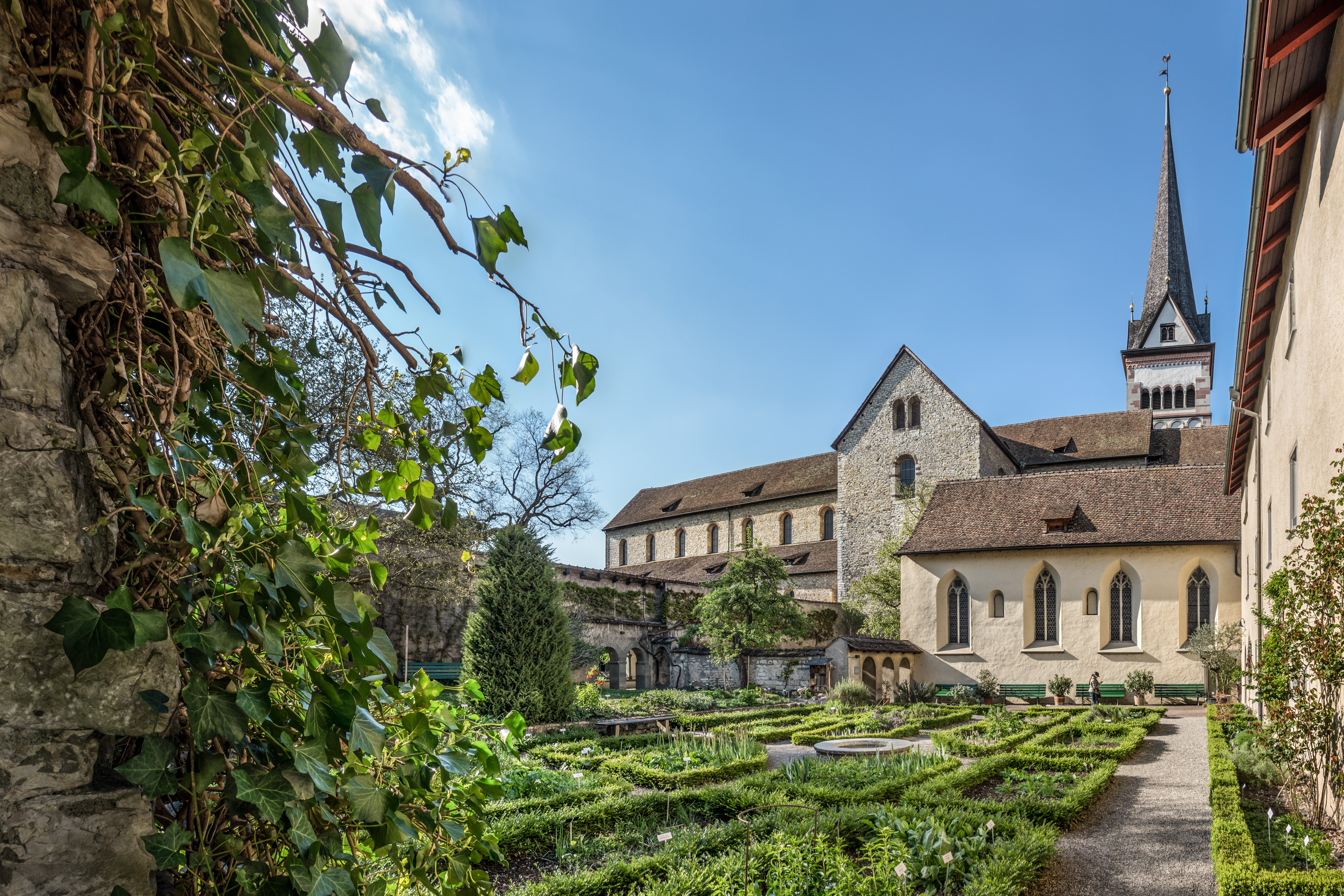
- Herb garden, abbey and the Münster

- Location within Switzerland Location within Canton of Schaffhausen
- Interactive map of the Kloster Allerheiligen area

General information
- Type: Former Benedictine abbey, Museum
- Classification: Historic monument
- Location: Schaffhausen, Switzerland
- Coordinates: 47.694897°N 8.63675°E
- Construction started: 1049 (first monastery)
- Completed: 1064 (first monastery)

Kloster Allerheiligen (lit. 'All Saints Abbey') is a former Benedictine monastery in the Swiss municipality of Schaffhausen in the Canton of Schaffhausen. Founded in 1049, it was converted into a community of canons in 1524 and dissolved in 1529. The former monastery complex includes the church Münster Allerheiligen and houses the Museum zu Allerheiligen.

== Geography ==
Today the convent houses the Museum zu Allerheiligen, an art museum and a natural history museum, the monastery garden, and the buildings of the former convent, including the library. The former monastery's building complex is located at the center of the historic old city of the municipality of Schaffhausen in the Canton of Schaffhausen, includes the oldest buildings that still exist in Schaffhausen.

== History ==
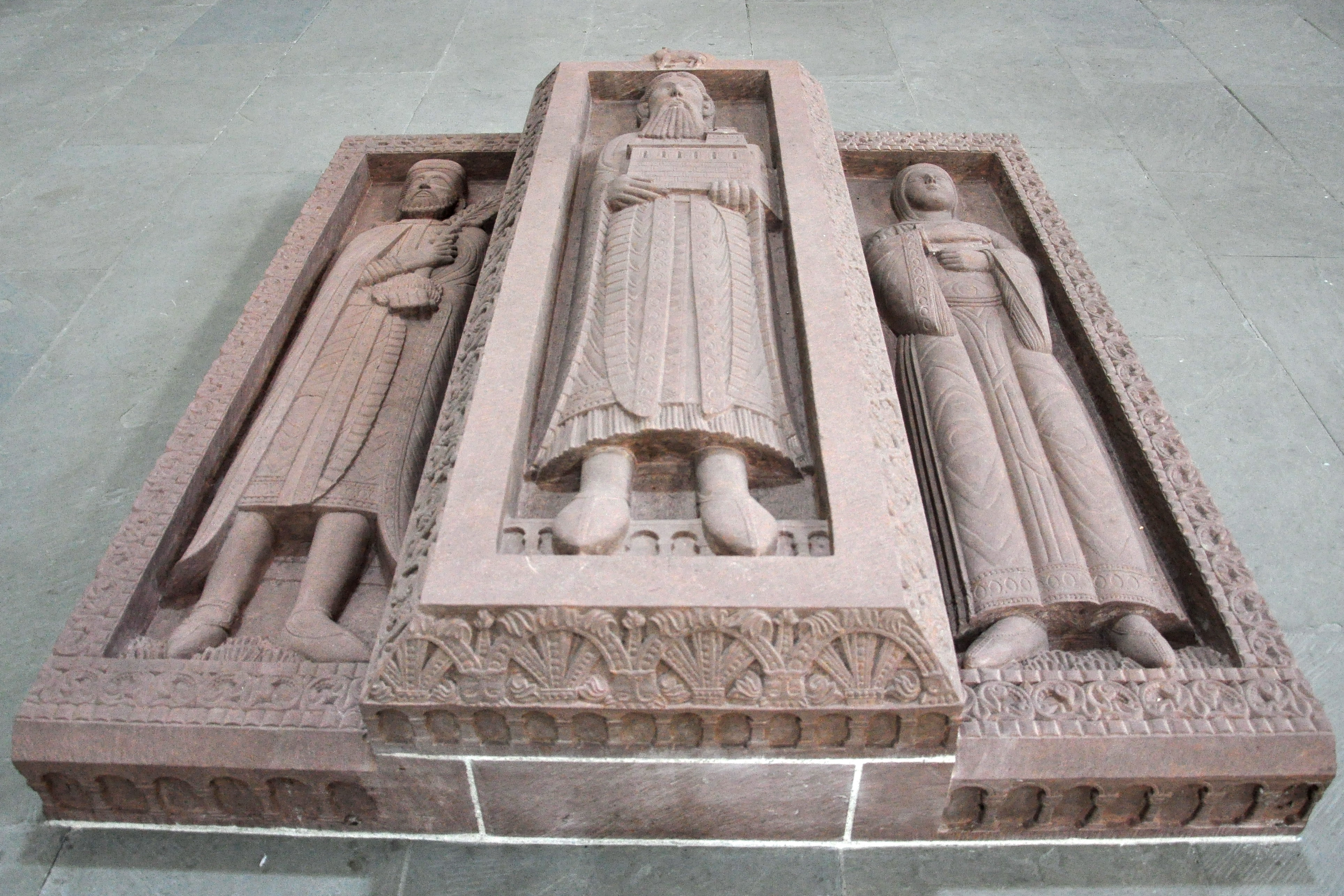
grave of the Nellenburg family inside the church

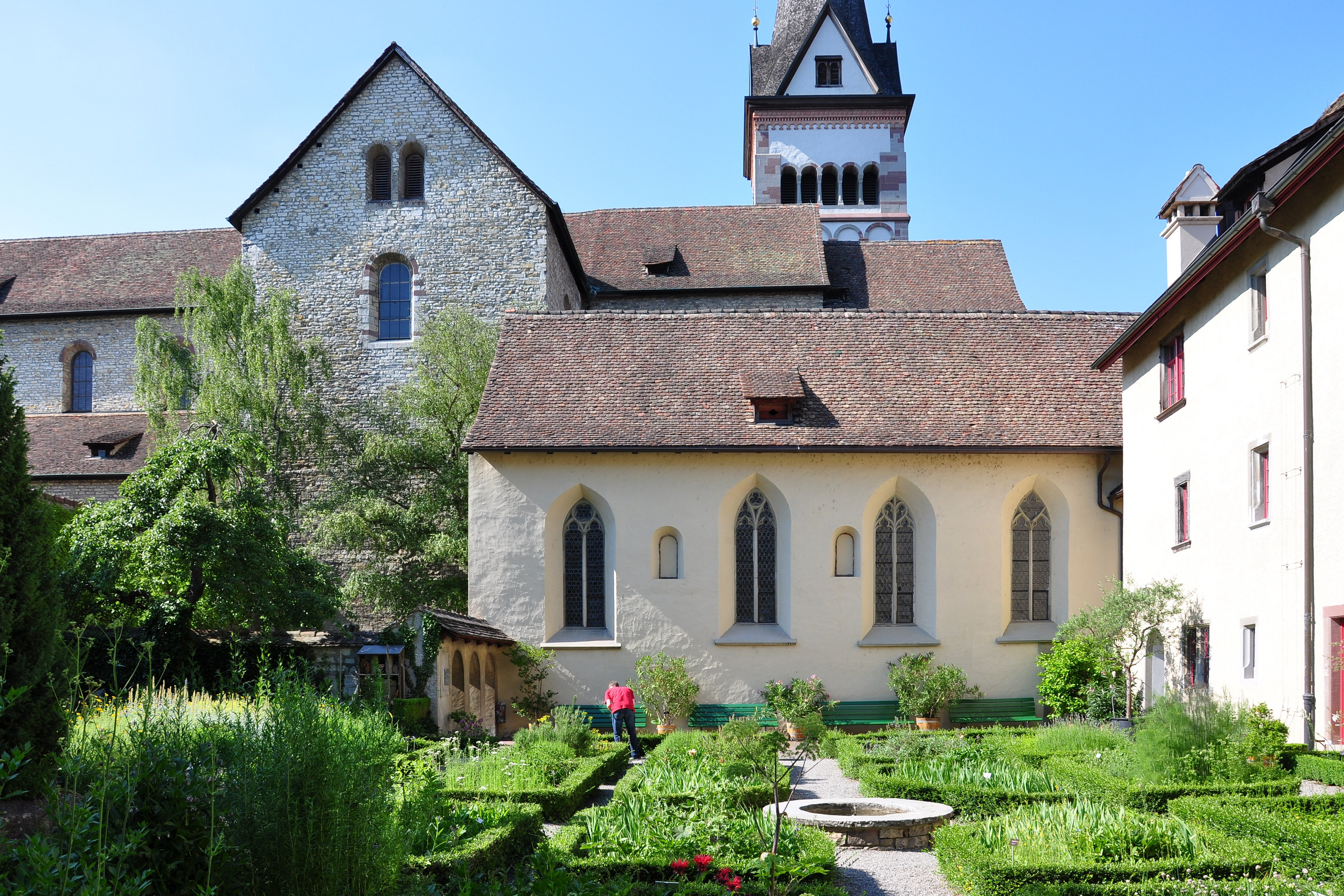
the former monastery's garden, as of today a herbal garden

The development of the city of Schaffhausen is closely linked to the Nellenburg noble family who became extinct around 1100 AD. Archaeological evidence indicates that the first church of St. Johann was built around 1000. Count Eberhard of Nellenburg developed Schaffhausen as a transshipment point for goods carried on the Rhine, which had to be transported overland to bypass the Rhine Falls. The monastery was founded by Eberhard von Nellenburg and his wife Ita. Its conventional foundation date is 1049, when Pope Leo IX consecrated an altar on 22 November; the first monastery church was consecrated in 1064. The church was dedicated to the Saviour, the Holy Cross, the Virgin Mary and All the Saints. In 1067, Eberhard obtained papal protection and privileges for the monastery from Pope Alexander II. Allerheiligen replaced Reichenau Abbey as the founding family's burial place and underwent several alterations and extensions. Eberhard became after 1075 a Benedictine monk in the abbey, and died there in 1078 or 1079. He was buried in the outdoor crypt that was built for the family.

During the Investiture Controversy, Count Burkhard von Nellenburg, Eberhard's son and heir, supported the papal party. In 1080 he relinquished his proprietary rights over the monastery, which was reformed by William of Hirsau according to the model of Hirsau Abbey. The monastery received substantial Nellenburg estates and the right to elect its abbot freely, and was placed directly under papal authority. Burkhard remained its Vogt (lay advocate). He also transferred Schaffhausen, with its mint, market and associated rights, to the monastery, making the abbot lord of the town.

The abbey held extensive, scattered estates in what are now Switzerland and southern Germany. In 1122, Arnold and Junzila of Hiltensweiler founded a monastic cell at Hiltensweiler and transferred it, together with property in nine settlements, to Allerheiligen. The community subsequently moved to Langnau. Allerheiligen relinquished its rights there in 1389.

After 1189, Allerheiligen became an imperial abbey (Reichskloster). During the 13th century, Schaffhausen's citizens increasingly acquired rights previously held by the monastery and developed their own civic institutions; a municipal seal is attested in 1253 and a council in 1272. A treaty of 1377 provided for arbitration of disputes between town and abbey. Following Schaffhausen's recovery of imperial immediacy in 1415, the town dominated the monastery. An attempt by the abbey to recover its rights as lord of Schaffhausen in 1480 failed in 1482.

The abbey nevertheless appeared alongside the town of Schaffhausen among the estates of the Swabian Circle listed in the imperial register of 1521.

The last three abbots reorganized the administration of the abbey's estates. The last abbot, Michael Eggenstorfer, undertook further building work in 1521–1522. In 1524, the abbey was converted into a collegiate foundation, and the Münster became the town's second principal church. The new foundation had twelve canons and was dissolved in 1529, following the introduction of the Reformation in Schaffhausen. The canons received lifetime maintenance, and the town became the monastery's legal successor.

== Convent buildings ==
The first extensions of the abbey included the east wing of the convent building with the chapter house of the monks on the ground floor, and a dormitory with latrines upstairs. In the west, the monastery gate, a two-storey house for guests and lay brothers were added, built around the three-aisled Basilica with a three-apsed choir, a transept and a double tower facade to the west. The westerly courtyard was also built in the foundation era, preceded by a single goal, which was flanked by two chapels. About this door system, there was possibly the entrance to the Nellenburg Palatinate, once the residence of the family. The monastery was modeled on the church buildings of the Cluny Abbey. The monastery consists of a cloister, the garden, the two-winged, two-storey convent buildings and the domestic buildings. In the mid-1460s Abbot Berchtold Wiechser initiated the construction of the Bindhaus (cooperage) over the large wine cellar. A Beguine house was added during the medieval expansion of about 1150–1250. In 1521/22 a new convent house with monks' cells replaced the old hospital. In 1529 the convent buildings were redeveloped as houses. Twelve years later, the city council moved the municipal cemetery in the former eastern cloister garden. In the winter of 1543, a boys' school was established. The cloister garden was used from 1577 to 1874 as the cemetery for the privileged citizens of Schaffhausen.

== Münster Schaffhausen ==
Eberhard von Nellenburg also financed the monastery's church third central tower to the west, extended with a new chancel choir grown in the apex outdoor crypt, as a burial chamber, and a subsequent courtyard. Around 1090, construction began on a larger church. Initially planned as a five-aisled basilica, it was completed as the present three-aisled church and consecrated in the early 12th century. Late Romanesque expansions were added between 1150 and 1250. Abbot Ullrich initiated the construction of the church tower, the present herb garden, the building of the hospital and the novitiate, as well as a loggia. The St. Johann's chapel was vaulted, and upstairs was a further chapel. The ornately decorated semi-circular arched lunettes of the former upper chapel, are among the finest examples of Romanesque architectural sculpture in the monastery, and are on display in the museum. In 1521/22 the old St. Mary's chapel was rebuilt into the Annakapelle. The small cemetery chapel, now the Oswaldkapelle, was also built during this campaign. The chapels of St. Michael and St. Erhard belong to the earlier expansion of about 1150–1250.

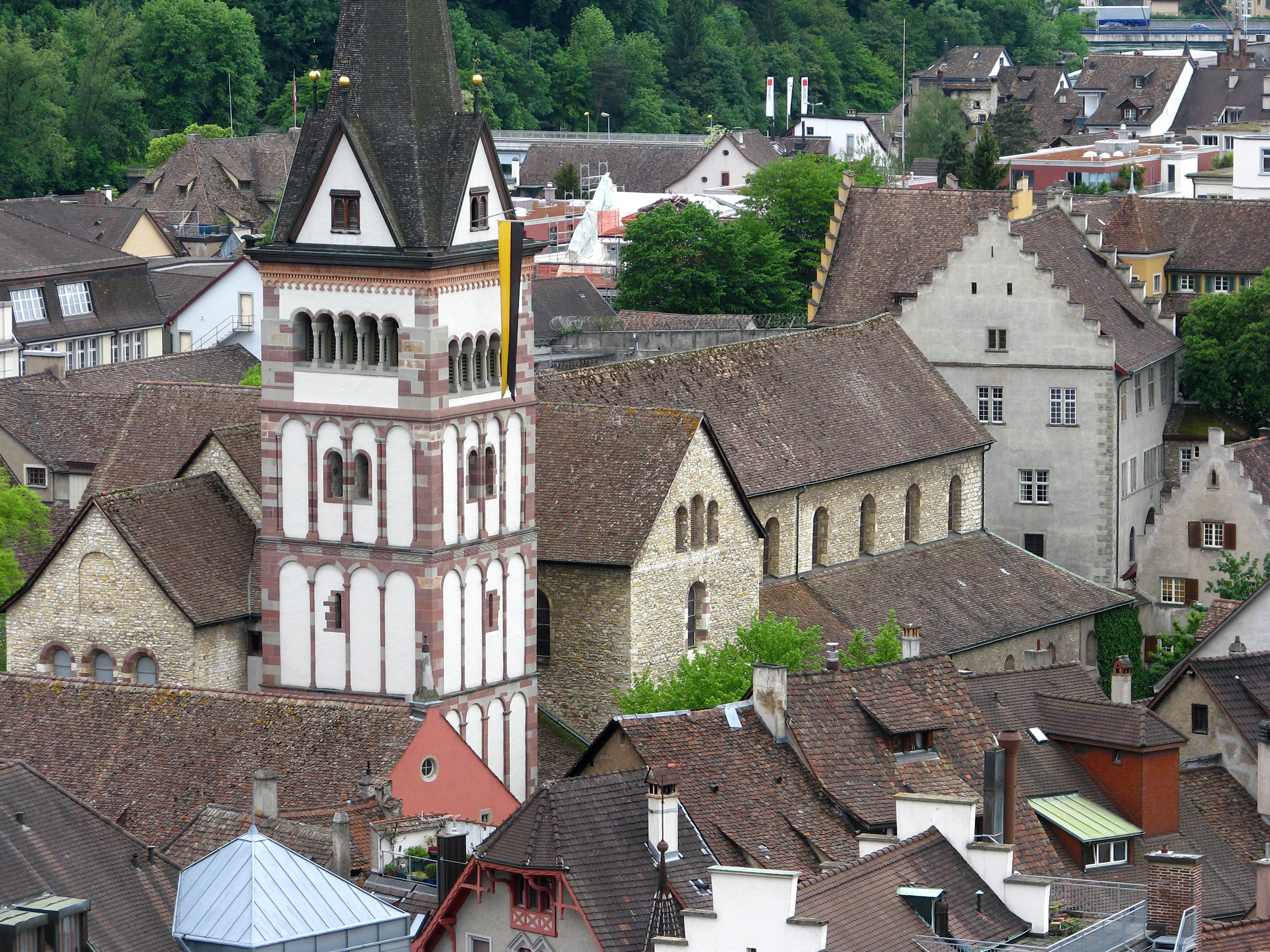
Münster as seen from the Munot hill

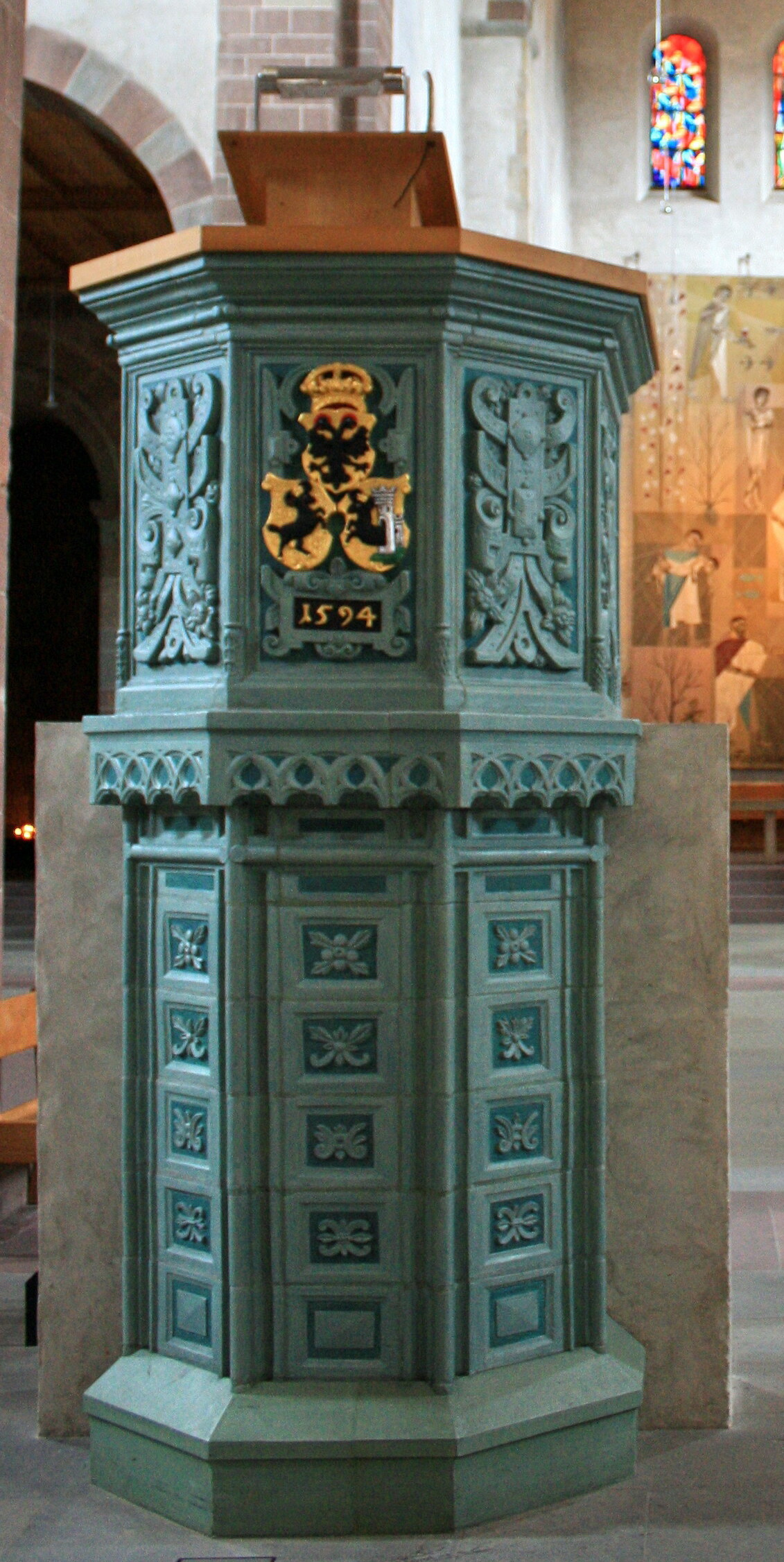
Pulpit in the basilica

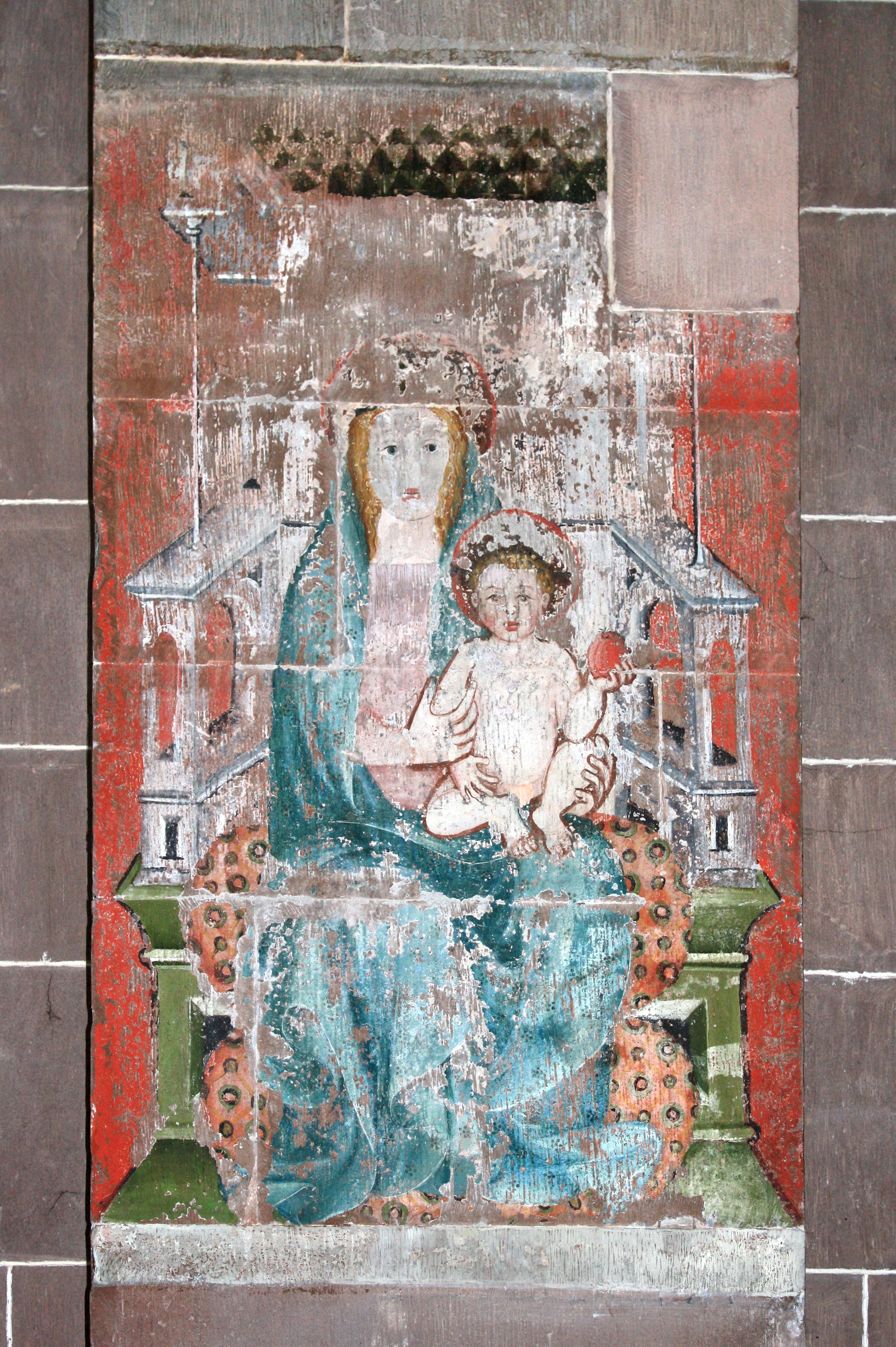
fresco in the basilica

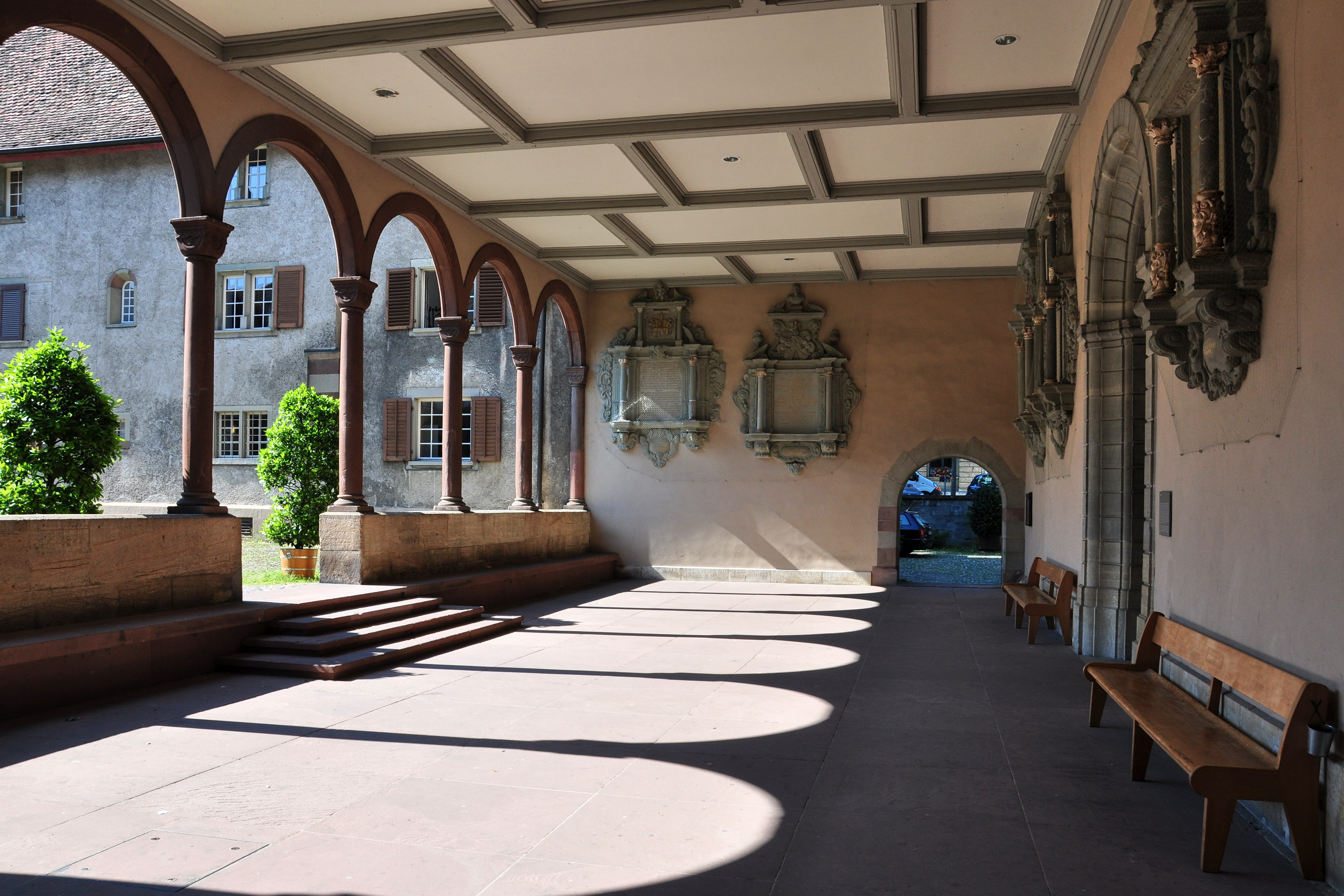
cloister and gravestones

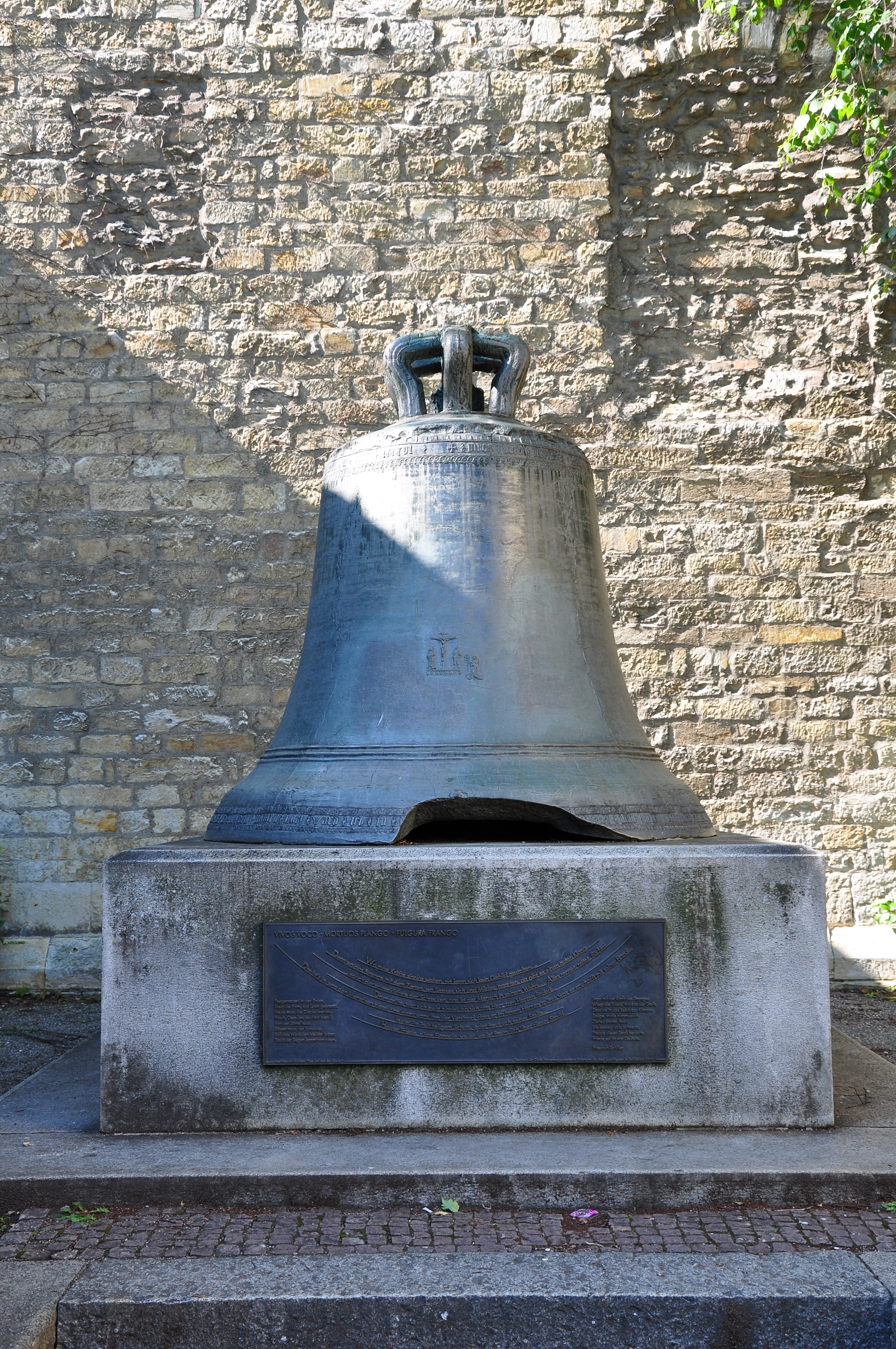
so-called Schillerglocke in the garden

== Bibliothek am Münsterplatz ==
The abbey's scriptorium produced manuscripts of the Bible and the Church Fathers. More than seventy parchment codices written there between 1080 and 1150 survive in the Ministerialbibliothek, which has been deposited in Schaffhausen's municipal library since 1923.

In the Middle Ages, the library was located in the Benedictine monastery, in the Franciscan mendicant and in St. Johann's church. After the Reformation the books were placed in the sacristy of St. Johann. The collection increased by gifts and purchases since 1540, and it was called Bibliotheca publica or Liberey, but still mainly used by the clergy. In 1636 citizens founded the municipal library, geared towards the sciences and arts, the present Stadtbibliothek (city library). In the 18th century two private reading societies re-established the Ministerialbibliothek, being the book collection in the St. Johann church. Since 1923 the city library has been located on the Münsterplatz Square, situated in a building that was built in 1554 as an urban granary. Between 1993 and 1995, the library was remodeled and expanded by an underground magazine, serving also as the cantonal library.

== Museum zu Allerheiligen ==
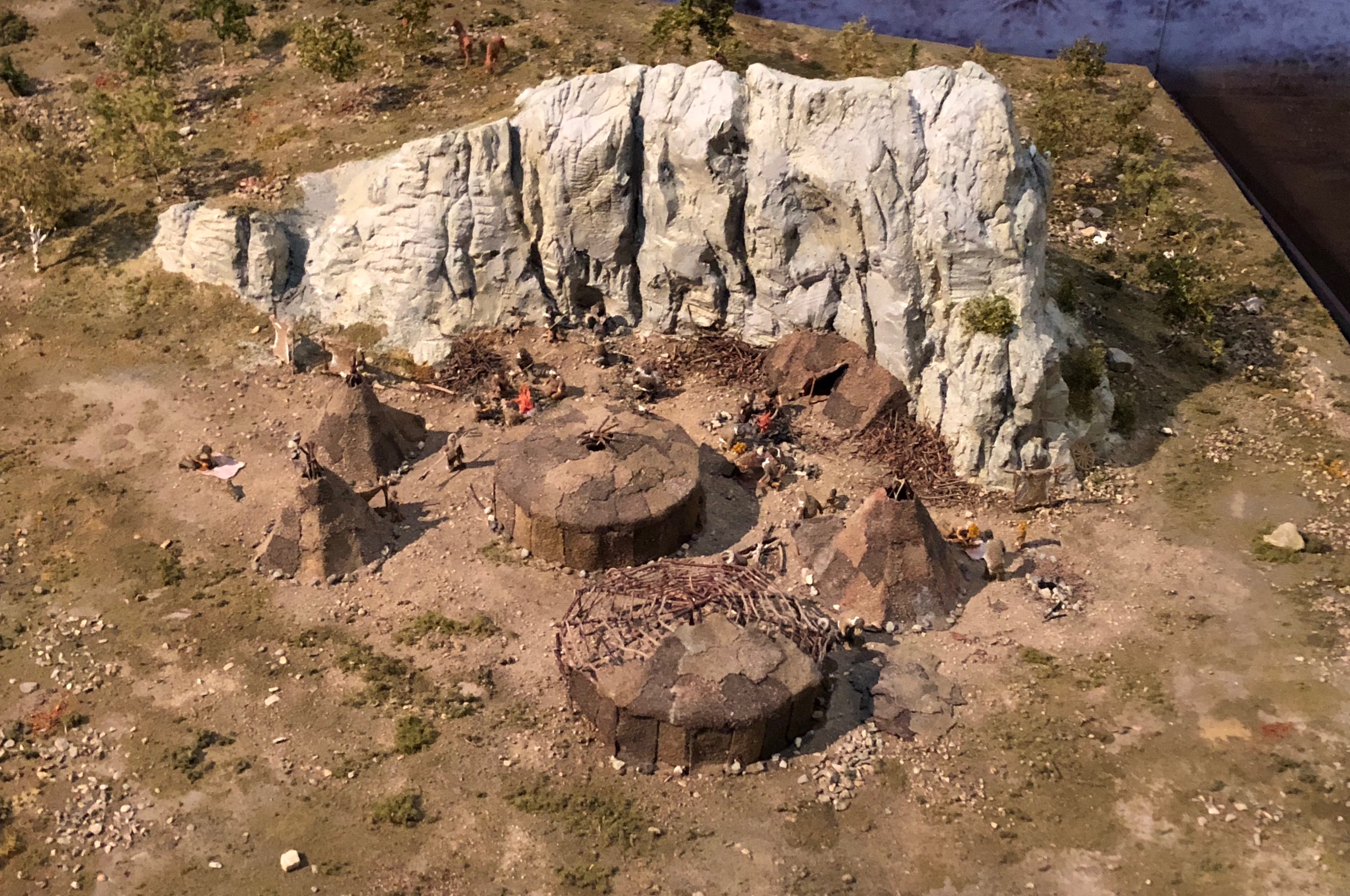
Model of the Paleolithic habitation ("camp site") Schweizersbild

The Museum zu Allerheiligen (English: "All Saints Museum") building complex was rebuilt between 1921 and 1938 into a museum, to house the great artistic and cultural historical collections, clubs, and private had gathered over decades, to be a place of storage and presentation. The museum exhibited during the first decades in the fields of archeology (e.g. finds from the Kesslerloch cave), history and art, focusing primarily on craft-oriented and categories as chronologically structured tours. An important extension was the integration of natural history collections and the construction of a natural history permanent exhibition. Since then, the museum also hosts regular natural history exhibitions.

Its extensive permanent collections and temporary exhibitions, the museum provides a wide variety of topics: Interdisciplinary special exhibitions stimulate discussion with current cultural and scientific themes, as well by the universality of the medieval monastery, the abbey church, the idyllic herb garden and the largest freely accessible cloister of Switzerland. It is operated by financial contribution of the canton of Schaffhausen, foundations, associations and sponsorships.

== Facilities ==
Public transportation to Schaffhausen railway station is provided by the Zurich S-Bahn (lines S9, S12, S24, S33) and InterCity and RegioExpress trains of Swiss Federal Railways from Zürich HB/Winterthur, or by Deutsche Bahn (DB) trains from Basel Badischer Bahnhof. Local bus lines of Verkehrsbetriebe Schaffhausen (vbsh) provide the stops Rhybadi/IWC by line 6 and Schifflände by lines 6, 8 and 25. Schifflände also has a pier served by boats of Schweizerische Schifffahrtsgesellschaft Untersee und Rhein (URh).

The museum is closed on Mondays, usually the museum is open from 11:00 (11 am) to 17:00 (5 pm); after hours visits are available by appointment, as well as guided tours for groups. The monastery's buildings houses the museum, as well as the museum's shop, a restaurant and rooms for seminars. The staff of the museum consists of approximately 25 employees.

== Cultural heritage of national importance ==
The abbey and the library are listed in the Swiss inventory of cultural property of national and regional significance as Class A objects of national importance.

== Literature ==
- Kurt Bänteli, Hans Peter Mathis: Das ehemalige Kloster zu Allerheiligen in Schaffhausen. Schweizerische Kunstführer GSK Nr. 757/758, Gesellschaft für Schweizerische Kunstgeschichte, Bern 2004.
- Kurt Bänteli: Das Kloster Allerheiligen in Schaffhausen. Zum 950. Jahr seiner Gründung am 22. November 1049. Schaffhauser Archäologie, Vol. 4, Schaffhausen 1999, ISBN 3-9521-8680-5.
- Thomas Hildbrand: Herrschaft, Schrift und Gedächtnis. Das Kloster Allerheiligen und sein Umgang mit Wissen in Wirtschaft, Recht und Archiv (11.-16. Jahrhundert). Zürich 1996, ISBN 3-9053-1193-3.
