= Adolphe-Marie Gubler =

French physician and pharmacologist

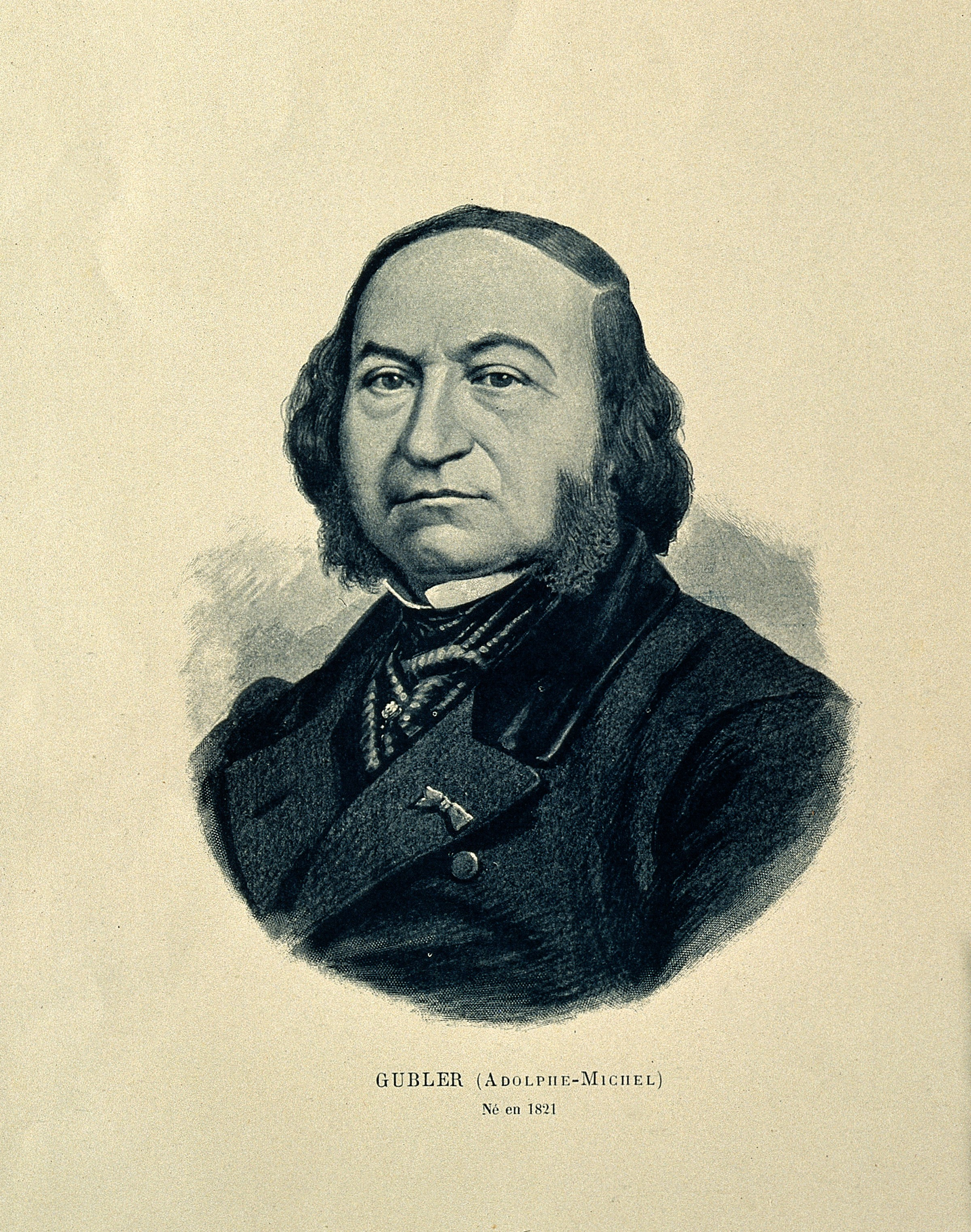
Adolphe-Marie Gubler

Adolphe-Marie Gubler (5 April 1821 – 20 April 1879) was a French medical doctor and pharmacologist born in Metz.

Originally a student of botany, he began his medical studies in 1841 at Paris, where he was a pupil of Armand Trousseau (1801–1867). In 1845 he became an interne des hôpitaux, earning his doctorate in 1849. Afterwards he worked as a physician at the Hôpital Beaujon, and in 1853 earned his agrégation with a thesis on cirrhosis of the liver. In 1868 he was appointed professor of therapy to the medical faculty in Paris, maintaining this position until his death in 1879.

Gubler made a number of contributions in the fields of medicine and pharmacology. He is credited with being the first physician to differentiate between hematogenous and hepatogenous icterus. His name is associated with "Millard–Gubler syndrome", a condition characterized by softening of brain tissue that is caused by blockage of blood vessels of the pons. The disease is named in conjunction with Auguste Louis Jules Millard (1830–1915), who initially described the disorder in 1855. The eponymous "Gubler's line" is a line of superficial origin of the trigeminal nerve on the pons, a lesion below which results in the aforementioned Millard–Gubler syndrome.

He was the author of many works on botany, clinical medicine, physiology and pharmacology, with several articles on the latter subject being published in the "Journal de thérapeutique". Among his better written efforts was an 1856 treatise on hemiplegia titled De l'hémiplégie alterne envisagée comme signe de lésion de la protubérance annulaire et comme preuve de la décussation des nerfs faciaux, and a major publication involving pharmacopoeia called Commentaires thérapeutiques du codex medicamentarius, a book that was awarded the "Chaussier Prize" (Prix Chaussier, named after anatomist François Chaussier) by the Académie des sciences.

Gubler was a founding member of the Société de biologie, and in 1865 became a member of the Académie de médecine.

While still an interne, he was asked by Dr. Trousseau to serve as a traveling companion to a young man suffering from emotional distress. While in Milan, Gubler was seriously wounded by a gunshot from his companion, forcing him to spend a year recuperating in Milan.
