= Eduard Gubler =

Swiss painter

- Born: 27 March 1891; Zürich, Switzerland
- Died: 18 May 1971 (aged 80); Zürich, Switzerland
- Occupations: Painter, graphic artist, drawing teacher
- Known for: Painting, graphic work
- Movement: Expressionism, Neue Sachlichkeit
- Relatives: Max Gubler, Ernst Gubler

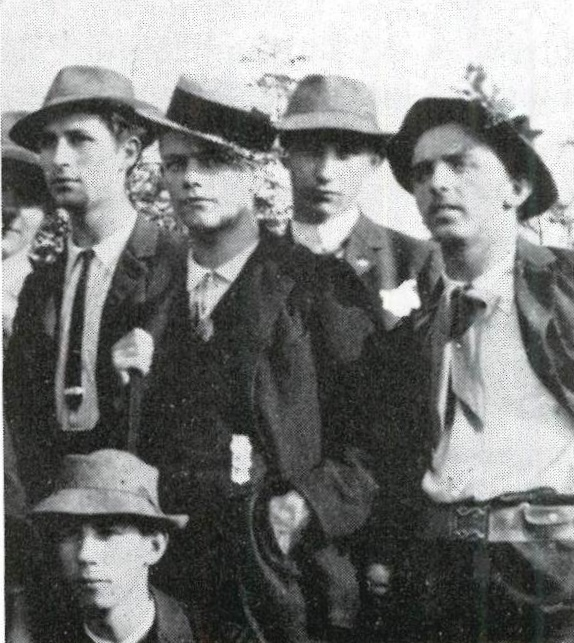
Eduard Gubler, left, on a school trip while attending the teacher training college in Küsnacht

Eduard Gubler (27 March 1891 – 18 May 1971) was a Swiss painter, graphic artist and drawing teacher. The eldest of the Gubler brothers, he studied at the Kunstgewerbeschule and the Academy of Fine Arts, Munich, in Munich before returning to Zurich, where he taught drawing until 1953. His work included portraits, landscapes and figure paintings, and was associated with Expressionism and Neue Sachlichkeit.

== Biography ==
Eduard Gubler was born on 27 March 1891 in Zurich. He was the eldest of the Gubler brothers, and the brother of the artists Ernst Gubler and Max Gubler.

From 1906 to 1910, Gubler attended the teacher training college in Küsnacht. From 1910 to 1913, he worked as a primary school teacher. He studied in Munich, first at the Kunstgewerbeschule from 1913 to 1914 and then at the Academy of Fine Arts from 1914 to 1916.

Gubler returned to Zurich in 1916 and began teaching drawing at the city’s secondary schools the following year. He remained a drawing teacher until his retirement in 1953. In 1927, he travelled to Paris with his brother Ernst. From 1905 to 1952, he regularly stayed in the Riedertal in Uri, and from 1949 he also spent time at Max Gubler’s studio house in Unterengstringen. He died in Zurich on 18 May 1971.

== Work ==
Alongside his teaching career, Gubler developed an extensive body of paintings and graphic work, including portraits, landscapes and figure paintings.

Gubler belonged to the circle of Zurich Expressionists. His early work included Symbolist, Impressionist and Realist elements. Later, his work was associated especially with Expressionism and, from 1918, Neue Sachlichkeit. The Riedertal in Uri became an important source of subjects for his paintings. He stopped producing printed graphic work after 1922.

== Selected works ==
Gubler’s 1917 painting St. Sebastian im Schnee mit Selbstbildnis (Im Riedertal) entered the Aargauer Kunsthaus collection in 2016 as a long-term loan from the Werner Coninx Foundation. It places Saint Sebastian in the snowy landscape of the Riedertal in Uri, a region that provided subjects for Gubler’s paintings.
