= Christian Moser (mathematician) =

Swiss actuary and professor of actuarial mathematics

Christian Moser (born 28 September 1861, Arni, Bern – 8 July 1935, Bern) was a Swiss actuary and professor of actuarial mathematics. He is known as one of the actuarial pioneers of the welfare state policies adopted by several European countries in the 20th century.

== Education and career ==
From 1882 to 1986 Moser studied mathematics and physics at the University of Bern and in Berlin and Paris. At the University of Bern he received in 1886 his doctorate (Promotion) and in 1887 habilitated. He subsequently worked as a Privatdozent in mathematics. In 1891 he was hired by the Swiss federal government as the first Swiss Federal Actuary — a position created at the suggestion of the Federal Statistician Johann Jakob Kummer (1828–1913). At the University of Bern, Moser taught as a part-time Privatdozent and then from 1901 to 1915 as an associate professor. In 1915 he was appointed a full professor and retired from the civil service. He retired from the University of Bern as professor emeritus in 1931.

In 1902 he was a co-founder of the University of Bern's institute for actuarial science. In the late 1890s he became a leading expert in the Swiss federal government for the formulation of the health and accident insurance law, which in 1900 was rejected in a referendum and in 1912 adopted in revised form.

He represented the welfare state positions and plans of the Swiss Confederation in international congresses and in 1905 was a founding member of the Association of Swiss Actuaries. The association encompassed both social insurance groups and private insurance industry representatives and thus promoted cooperation and exchange of information among industry-related and state-related actuaries. In 1904 he succeeded his mentor Johann Jakob Kummer in the post of Director of the Federal Insurance Office.

In 1932 Moser was an Invited Speaker at the International Congress of Mathematicians in Bern. Many leading actuarial mathematicians employed by the Swiss federal government or the Schweizerische Unfallversicherungsanstalt (Swiss Institute for Accident Insurance, Suva), including the future director of Suva, Arnold Bohren (1875–1957), were taught by Moser.
