= Character evolution =

Character evolution is the process by which a character or trait (a certain body part or property of an organism) evolves along the branches of an evolutionary tree. Character evolution usually refers to single changes within a lineage that make this lineage unique from others. These changes are called character state changes and they are often used in the study of evolution to provide a record of common ancestry. Character state changes can be phenotypic changes, nucleotide substitutions, or amino acid substitutions. These small changes in a species can be identifying features of when exactly a new lineage diverged from an old one.

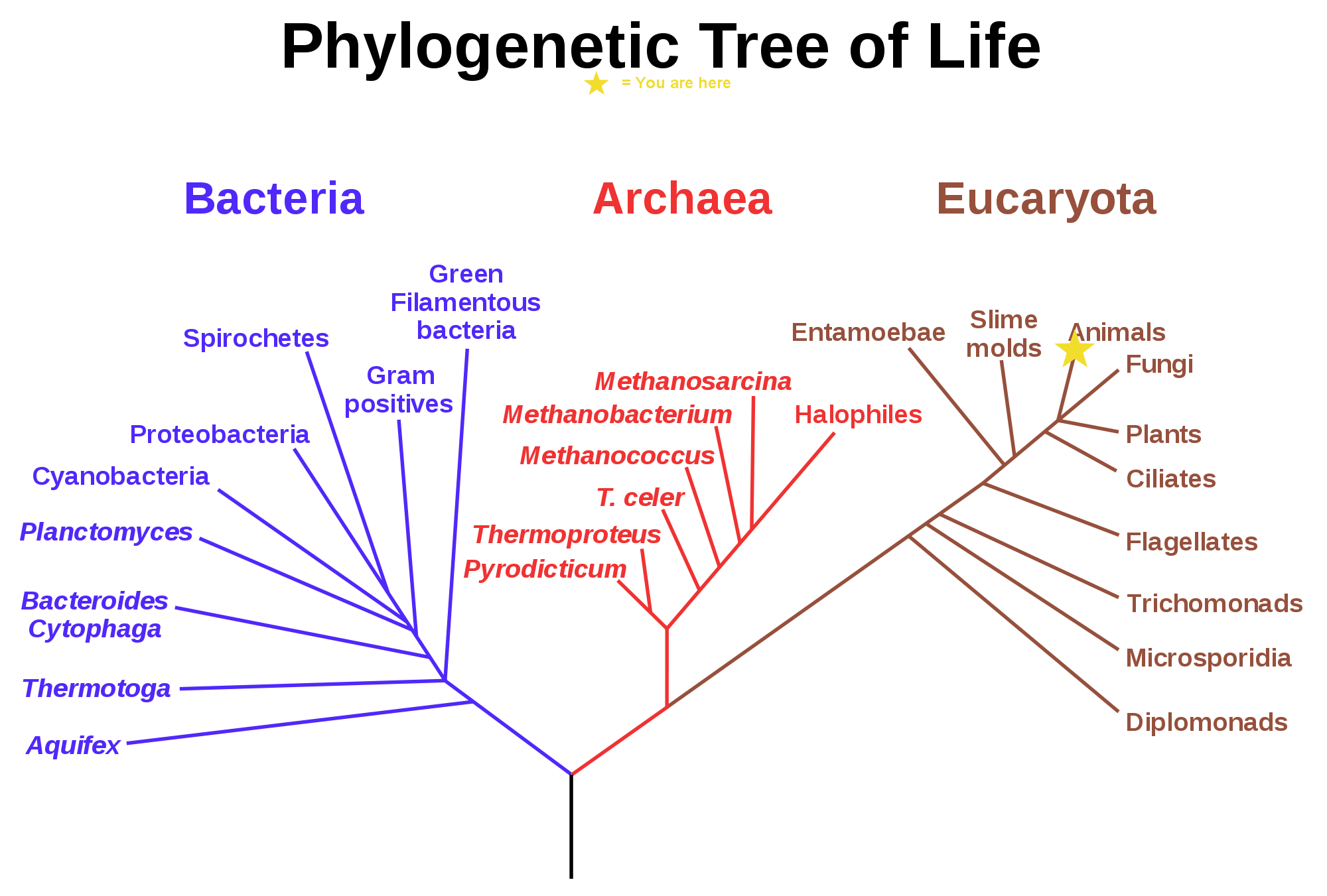
A phylogenetic tree

== Phylogenetics ==
In the study of phylogenetics or cladistics, researchers can look at the characters shared by a collection of species and then group them into what is called a clade. The term clade was coined in 1957 by the biologist Julian Huxley to refer to the result of cladogenesis, a concept Huxley borrowed from Bernhard Rensch. A clade is by definition monophyletic, meaning it contains one ancestor (which can be an organism, a population, or a species) and all its descendants.

== Natural selection ==
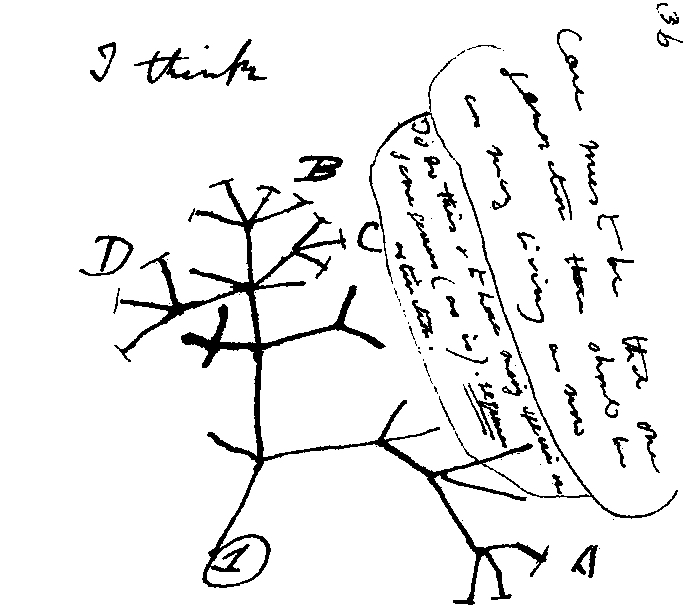
Charles Darwin's first sketch of an evolutionary tree

Natural Selection is the process by which organisms that are better adapted to their environment are selected to survive and reproduce more offspring. Natural selection selects for the phenotype or the characteristics of an organism that gives the organism a reproductive advantage in which it becomes the gene pool of a population. In addition, mutations also arise in the genome of an individual organism and offspring(s) can inherit such mutations. This genetic variation allows more organisms to adapt to a changing environment.

== Maximum parsimony ==
It is often the case in the study of phylogenies that the vast majority of organisms of interest are long extinct. It is therefore a matter of speculation to reconstruct what ancestral organisms existed long before the present time, and how the evolutionary process led from one organism to another, and which present-day organisms are most closely related. Character evolution and the character state changes that drive this type of evolution are what help researchers construct these trees in a fashion referred to as maximum parsimony. When talking about phylogenetics, maximum parsimony refers to a method of inferring a phylogenetic tree in a way that minimizes the number of implied character state transformations in the observed data (hence maximally parsimonious). The basic ideas were presented by James S. Farris in 1970.

Although fairly effective, maximum parsimony (like any method of phylogenetic inference) may not recover the true course of evolution for a given feature. For a number of reasons, two organisms can possess a trait not present in their last common ancestor. The phenomena of convergent evolution, parallel evolution, and evolutionary reversals (collectively termed homoplasy) are evolutionary forces that may disrupt the effectiveness of the maximum parsimony method of inferring phylogenetic relationships. However, Rindal and Brower showed that the vast majority of the time, parsimony and model-based phylogenetic analyses of the same data sets gave results that were not significantly different from one another, implying that if parsimony is producing false hypotheses of relationships due to homoplasy, then the Maximum Likelihood or Bayesian methods are doing so as well.

== Theory of Inheritance of Acquired Characteristics ==
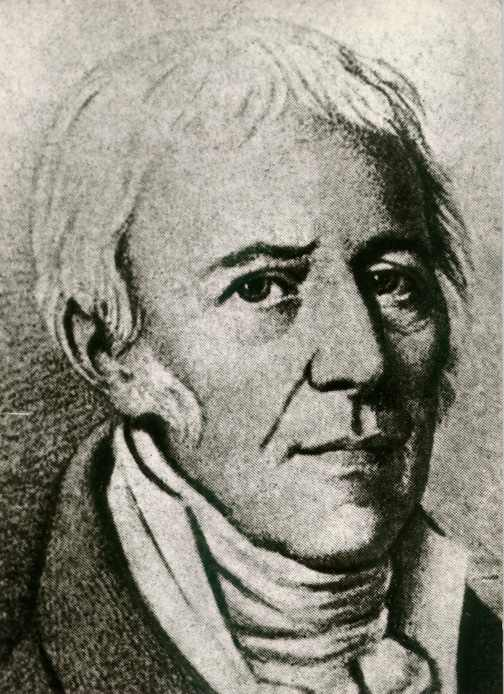
Jean-Baptise Lamarck, the creator of the theory of inheritance of acquired characteristics

Lamarck is best known for his Theory of Inheritance of Acquired Characteristics in 1801. His theory states that the characteristics an organism acquires throughout its life in order to adapt to its environment are passed down to its offspring. For example, Lamarck believed that the long necks of giraffes evolved as generations of giraffes reached for ever higher leaves of a tree. Their offspring and later generations inherited the resulting long necks.
