= Optimality criterion =

In statistics, an optimality criterion provides a measure of the fit of the data to a given hypothesis, to aid in model selection. A model is designated as the "best" of the candidate models if it gives the best value of an objective function measuring the degree of satisfaction of the criterion used to evaluate the alternative hypotheses.

The term has been used to identify the different criteria that are used to evaluate a phylogenetic tree. For example, in order to determine the best topology between two phylogenetic trees using the maximum likelihood optimality criterion, one would calculate the maximum likelihood score of each tree and choose the one that had the better score. However, different optimality criteria can select different hypotheses. In such circumstances caution should be exercised when making strong conclusions.

Many other disciplines use similar criteria or have specific measures geared toward the objectives of the field. Optimality criteria include maximum likelihood, Bayesian, maximum parsimony, sum of squared residuals, least absolute deviations, and many others.
