= List of things named after Arthur Cayley =

Arthur Cayley (1821 – 1895) is the eponym of all the things listed below.

- Cayley absolute
- Cayley algebra
- Cayley computer algebra system
- Cayley diagrams – used for finding cognate linkages in mechanical engineering
- Cayley graph
- Cayley numbers
- Cayley plane
- Cayley table
- Cayley transform
- Cayleyan
- Cayley–Bacharach theorem
- Cayley–Dickson construction
- Cayley–Hamilton theorem in linear algebra
- Cayley-Klein parameters
- Cayley–Klein metric
- Cayley–Klein model of hyperbolic geometry
- Cayley–Menger determinant
- Cayley–Purser algorithm
- Cayley's formula
- Cayley's hyperdeterminant
- Cayley's mousetrap — a card game
- Cayley's nodal cubic surface
- Cayley normal 2-complement theorem
- Cayley's ruled cubic surface
- Cayley's sextic
- Cayley's theorem
- Cayley's Ω process
- Chasles–Cayley–Brill formula
- Grassmann–Cayley algebra
- The crater Cayley on the Moon
