= Arthur Cayley =

English mathematician (1821–1895)

Arthur Cayley FRS
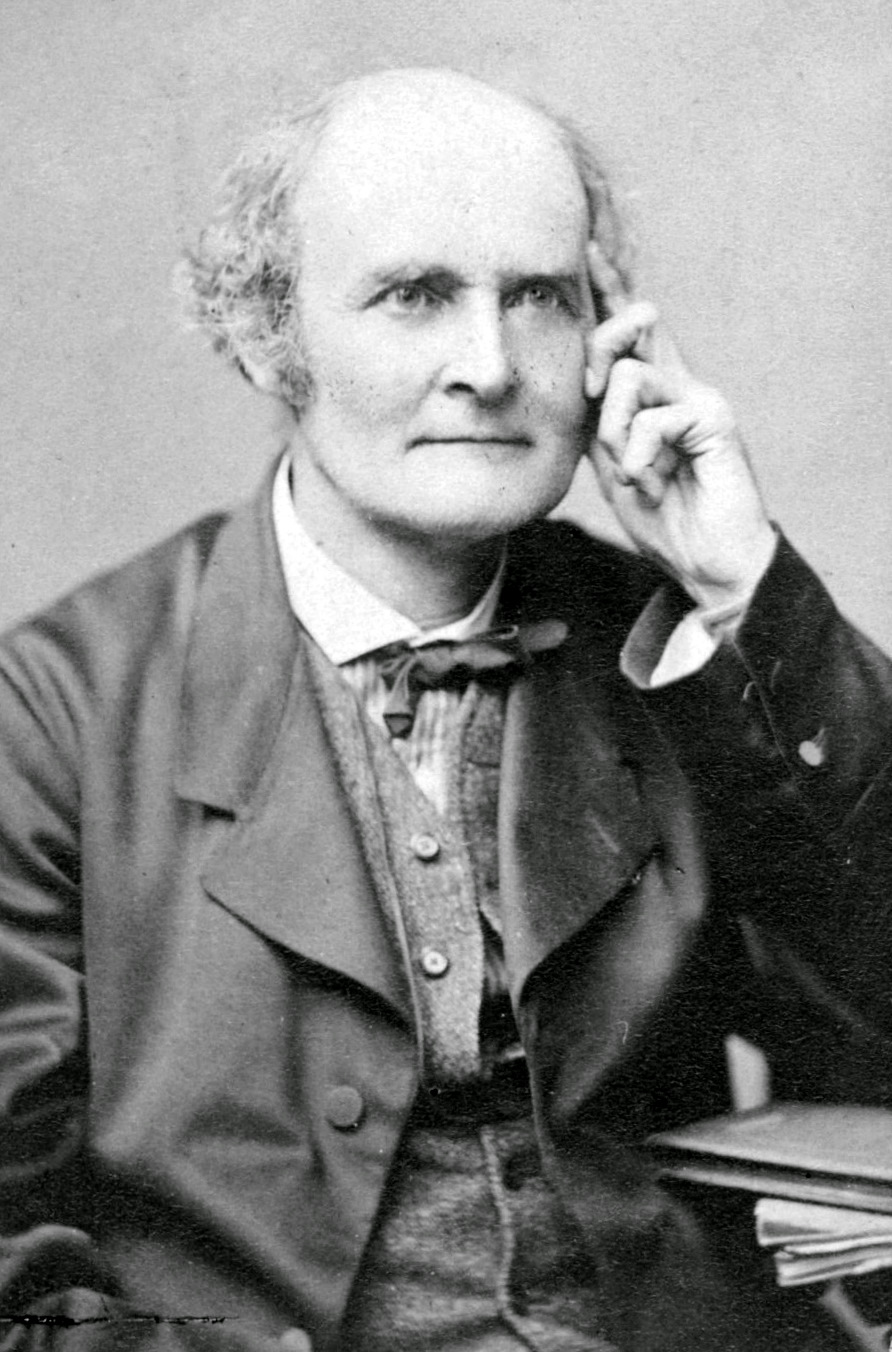
- Born: 16 August 1821; Richmond, Surrey, England
- Died: 26 January 1895 (aged 73); Cambridge, England
- Education: Trinity College, Cambridge (BA, 1842)
- Known for: Algebraic geometry; Group theory; Cayley–Hamilton theorem; Cayley–Dickson construction
- Awards: Smith's Prize (1842); De Morgan Medal (1884); Royal Medal (1859); Copley Medal (1882)
- Scientific career
- Fields: Mathematics
- Workplaces: Trinity College, Cambridge
- Academic advisors: George Peacock; William Hopkins
- Notable students: H. F. Baker; Andrew Forsyth; Charlotte Scott

Arthur Cayley (/ˈkeɪli/; 16 August 1821 – 26 January 1895) was an English mathematician who worked mostly on algebra. He helped found the modern British school of pure mathematics, and was a professor at Trinity College, Cambridge for 35 years.

He postulated what is now known as the Cayley–Hamilton theorem—that every square matrix is a root of its own characteristic polynomial, and verified it for matrices of order 2 and 3. He was the first to define the concept of an abstract group, a set with a binary operation satisfying certain laws, as opposed to Évariste Galois' concept of permutation groups. In group theory, Cayley tables, Cayley graphs, and Cayley's theorem are named in his honour, as well as Cayley's formula in combinatorics.

== Early life ==
Arthur Cayley was born in Richmond, London, England, on 16 August 1821. His father, Henry Cayley, was a distant cousin of George Cayley, the aeronautics engineer innovator, and descended from an ancient Yorkshire family. He settled in Saint Petersburg, Russia, as a merchant. His mother was Maria Antonia Doughty, daughter of William Doughty. According to some writers she was Russian, but her father's name indicates an English origin. His brother was the linguist Charles Bagot Cayley. Arthur spent his first eight years in Saint Petersburg. In 1829 his parents were settled permanently at Blackheath, London, where Arthur attended a private school.

At age 14, he was sent to King's College School. The young Cayley enjoyed complex maths problems, and the school's master observed indications of his mathematical genius. He advised the father to educate his son not for his own business, as he had intended, but at the University of Cambridge.

== Education ==
At the age of 17 Cayley began residence at Trinity College, Cambridge, where he excelled in Greek, French, German, and Italian, as well as mathematics. The cause of the Analytical Society had now triumphed, and the Cambridge Mathematical Journal had been instituted by Gregory and Robert Leslie Ellis. To this journal, at the age of twenty, Cayley contributed three papers, on subjects that had been suggested by reading the Mécanique analytique of Joseph Louis Lagrange and some of the works of Laplace.

Cayley's tutor at Cambridge was George Peacock and his private coach was William Hopkins. He finished his undergraduate course by winning the place of Senior Wrangler, and the first Smith's prize. His next step was to take the M.A. degree, and win a Fellowship by competitive examination. He continued to reside at Cambridge University for four years; during which time he took some pupils, but his main work was the preparation of 28 memoirs to the Mathematical Journal.

== Law career ==
Because of the limited tenure of his fellowship it was necessary to choose a profession; like De Morgan, Cayley chose law, and was admitted to Lincoln's Inn, London on 20 April 1846 at the age of 24. He made a specialty of conveyancing. It was while he was a pupil at the bar examination that he went to Dublin to hear William Rowan Hamilton's lectures on quaternions.

His friend J. J. Sylvester, his senior by five years at Cambridge, was then an actuary, resident in London; they used to walk together round the courts of Lincoln's Inn, discussing the theory of invariants and covariants. During these fourteen years, Cayley produced between two and three hundred papers.

== Professorship ==
Around 1860, Cambridge University's Lucasian Professor of Mathematics (Newton's chair) was supplemented by the new Sadleirian professorship, using funds bequeathed by Lady Sadleir, with the 42-year-old Cayley as its first holder. His duties were "to explain and teach the principles of pure mathematics and to apply himself to the advancement of that science." He gave up a lucrative legal practice for a modest salary, but never regretted the exchange, since it allowed him to devote his energies to the pursuit that he liked best. He at once married and settled down in Cambridge, and (unlike Hamilton) enjoyed a home life of great happiness. Sylvester, his friend from his bachelor days, once expressed his envy of Cayley's peaceful family life, whereas the unmarried Sylvester had to fight the world all his days.

At first the Sadleirian professor was paid to lecture over one of the terms of the academic year, but the university financial reform of 1886 freed funds to extend his lectures to two terms. For many years his courses were attended only by a few students who had finished their examination preparation, but after the reform the attendance numbered about fifteen. He generally lectured on his current research topic.

As for his duty to the advancement of mathematical science, he published a long and fruitful series of memoirs ranging over all of pure mathematics. He also became the standing referee on the merits of mathematical papers to many societies both at home and abroad.

In 1872, he was made an honorary fellow of Trinity College, and three years later an ordinary fellow, a paid position. About this time his friends subscribed for a presentation portrait. Maxwell wrote an address praising Cayley's principal works, including his Chapters on the Analytical Geometry of $n$ dimensions; On the theory of Determinants; Memoir on the theory of Matrices; Memoirs on skew surfaces, otherwise Scrolls; and on the delineation of a Cubic Scroll.

In addition to his work on algebra, Cayley made fundamental contributions to algebraic geometry. Cayley and Salmon discovered the 27 lines on a cubic surface. Cayley constructed the Chow variety of all curves in projective 3-space. He founded the algebro-geometric theory of ruled surfaces. His contributions to combinatorics include counting the n^{n}^{−2} trees on n labeled vertices by the pioneering use of generating functions.

In 1876, he published a Treatise on Elliptic Functions. He took great interest in the movement for the university education of women. At Cambridge the first women's colleges were Girton and Newnham. In the early days of Girton College he gave direct help in teaching, and for some years he was chairman of the council of Newnham College, in the progress of which he took the keenest interest to the last.

In 1881, he received from the Johns Hopkins University, Baltimore, where Sylvester was then professor of mathematics, an invitation to deliver a course of lectures. He accepted the invitation, and lectured at Baltimore during the first five months of 1882 on the subject of the Abelian and Theta Functions.

He was awarded honorary membership of the Manchester Literary and Philosophical Society in 1859. and in 1893, Cayley became a foreign member of the Royal Netherlands Academy of Arts and Sciences.

== British Association presidency ==
In 1883, Cayley was President of the British Association for the Advancement of Science. The meeting was held at Southport, in the north of England. As the President's address is one of the great popular events of the meeting, and brings out an audience of general culture, it is usually made as least technical as possible. Cayley (1996) took for his subject the Progress of Pure Mathematics.

== The Collected Papers ==
In 1889, the Cambridge University Press began the publication of his collected papers, which he appreciated very much. He edited seven of the quarto volumes himself, though suffering from a painful internal malady. He died 26 January 1895 at age 73. His funeral at Trinity Chapel was attended by the leading scientists of Britain, with official representatives from as far as Russia and America.

The remainder of his papers were edited by Andrew Forsyth, his successor as Sadleirian professor, in total thirteen quarto volumes and 967 papers. His work continues in frequent use, cited in more than 200 mathematical papers in the 21st century alone.

Cayley retained to the last his fondness for novel-reading and for travelling. He also took special pleasure in paintings and architecture, and he practiced water-colour painting, which he found useful sometimes in making mathematical diagrams.

== Legacy ==
Cayley is buried in the Mill Road cemetery, Cambridge.

An 1874 portrait of Cayley by Lowes Cato Dickinson and an 1884 portrait by William Longmaid are in the collection of Trinity College, Cambridge.

A number of mathematical terms are named after him:

- Cayley's theorem
- Cayley–Hamilton theorem in linear algebra
- Cayley–Bacharach theorem
- Grassmann–Cayley algebra
- Cayley–Menger determinant
- Cayley diagrams – used for finding cognate linkages in mechanical engineering
- Cayley–Dickson construction
- Cayley algebra (Octonion)
- Cayley graph
- Cayley numbers
- Cayley's sextic
- Cayley table
- Cayley–Purser algorithm
- Cayley's formula
- Cayley–Klein metric
- Cayley–Klein model of hyperbolic geometry
- Cayley's Ω process
- Cayley surface
- Cayley transform
- Cayley's nodal cubic surface
- Cayley's ruled cubic surface
- Cayley's mousetrap — a card game
- Cayleyan
- Chasles–Cayley–Brill formula
- Hyperdeterminant
- Quippian
- Tetrahedroid

The crater Cayley on the Moon (and consequently the Cayley Formation, a geological unit named after the crater) is named after him.

== Bibliography ==
- Cayley, Arthur (2009) [1876], An elementary treatise on elliptic functions, Cornell University Library, ISBN 978-1-112-28006-1, MR 0124532
- Cayley, Arthur (2009) [1889], The Collected Mathematical Papers, Cambridge Library Collection – Mathematics, vol. 14 volumes, Cambridge University Press, ISBN 978-1-108-00507-4, archive
- Cayley, Arthur (1894), The principles of book-keeping by double entry, Cambridge University Press

== See also ==
- List of things named after Arthur Cayley

== Sources ==
- Cayley, Arthur (1996) [1883], "Presidential address to the British Association", in Ewald, William (ed.), From Kant to Hilbert: a source book in the foundations of mathematics. Vol. I, II, Oxford Science Publications, The Clarendon Press Oxford University Press, pp. 542–573, ISBN 978-0-19-853271-2, MR 1465678, Reprinted in collected mathematical papers volume 11
- Crilly, Tony (1995), "A Victorian Mathematician: Arthur Cayley (1821–1895)", The Mathematical Gazette, 79 (485), The Mathematical Association: 259–262, doi:10.2307/3618297, ISSN 0025-5572, JSTOR 3618297, S2CID 188006684
- Crilly, Tony (2006), Arthur Cayley. Mathematician laureate of the Victorian age, Johns Hopkins University Press, ISBN 978-0-8018-8011-7, MR 2284396
- Macfarlane, Alexander (2009) [1916], Lectures on Ten British Mathematicians of the Nineteenth Century, Mathematical monographs, vol. 17, Cornell University Library, ISBN 978-1-112-28306-2 (complete text at Project Gutenberg)
