= Cayley surface =

Cayley surface may refer to:

- Cayley's nodal cubic surface
- Cayley's ruled cubic surface
