= Rat trap (disambiguation) =

A rat trap is a trap designed to catch rats.

Rat Trap or Rattrap may also refer to:

== Film ==
- Rat Trap (film), a 1963 French film
- Elippathayam (The Rat Trap), a 1981 Indian film

== Literature ==
- The Rat Trap, a 1904 novel by Dolf Wyllarde
- The Rat Trap, a 1918 play by Noël Coward
- The Rat Trap, a 1928 novel by William Le Queux
- Rat Trap (novel), a 1976 novel by Craig Thomas
- The Rat Trap, a 1993 novel by Kevin D. Randle; the second installment in the Galactic MI series

== Television ==
- "Rat Trap", Brotherhood (Brazilian) season 1, episode 3 (2019)
- "Rat Trap", Dial 999 episode 35 (1959)
- "Rat Trap", I Married a Mobster season 1, episode 5 (2011)
- "Rat Trap", Mr. Bean: The Animated Series series 4, episode 8 (2015)
- "Rat Trap", New Captain Scarlet series 1, episode 4 (2005)
- "Rat Trap", New York Undercover season 4, episode 6 (1998)
- "Rat Trap", Orm and Cheep series 2, episode 12 (1987)
- "Rat Trap", Stingers season 2, episode 5 (1999)
- "Rat Trap", The Agency (2024) season 1, episode 5 (2024)
- "Rat Trap", The Secret World of Alex Mack season 2, episode 8 (1995)
- "Rat Trap", T.U.F.F. Puppy season 2, episode 11a (2013)
- "Rat Trap", WordGirl season 4, episode 5b (2011)
- "Rat Traps", All Grown Up! season 4, episode 6 (2007)
- "The Rat Trap", Caught Red Handed episode 4 (2012)

== Other media ==
- "Rat Trap", a 1978 song by the Boomtown Rats
- Rattrap (Transformers), a fictional character from the Transformers toyline
- Rat-Trap (video game) or Krusty's Fun House, a 1992 video game
- Rat Trap (audio drama), a 2011 Doctor Who audio drama

== See also ==
- Mousetrap (disambiguation)
