= Segre surface =

In algebraic geometry, a Segre surface, studied by Corrado Segre (1884) and Beniamino Segre (1951), is an intersection of two quadrics in 4-dimensional projective space. They are rational surfaces isomorphic to a projective plane blown up in 5 points with no 3 on a line, and are del Pezzo surfaces of degree 4, and have 16 rational lines.

The term "Segre surface" is also occasionally used for various other surfaces, such as a quadric in 3-dimensional projective space (see Segre embedding), or the hypersurface

$$x_1 x_2 x_3 + x_2 x_3 x_4 + x_3 x_4 x_5 + x_4 x_5 x_1 + x_5 x_1 x_2 = 0. \,$$
