= Clebsch surface =

Non-singular cubic surface in mathematics

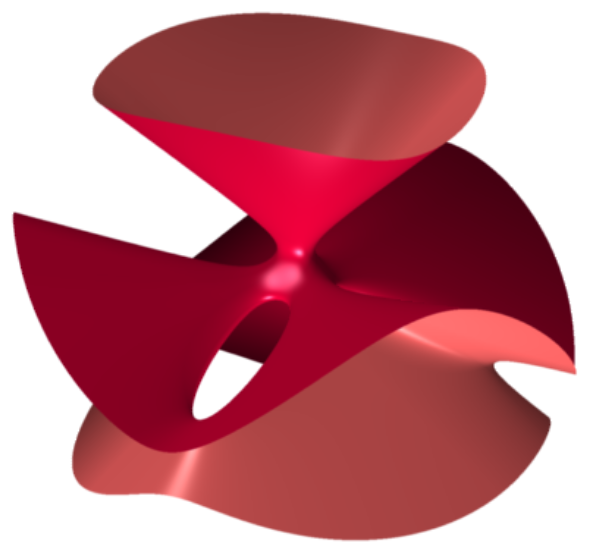
The Clebsch cubic in a local chart

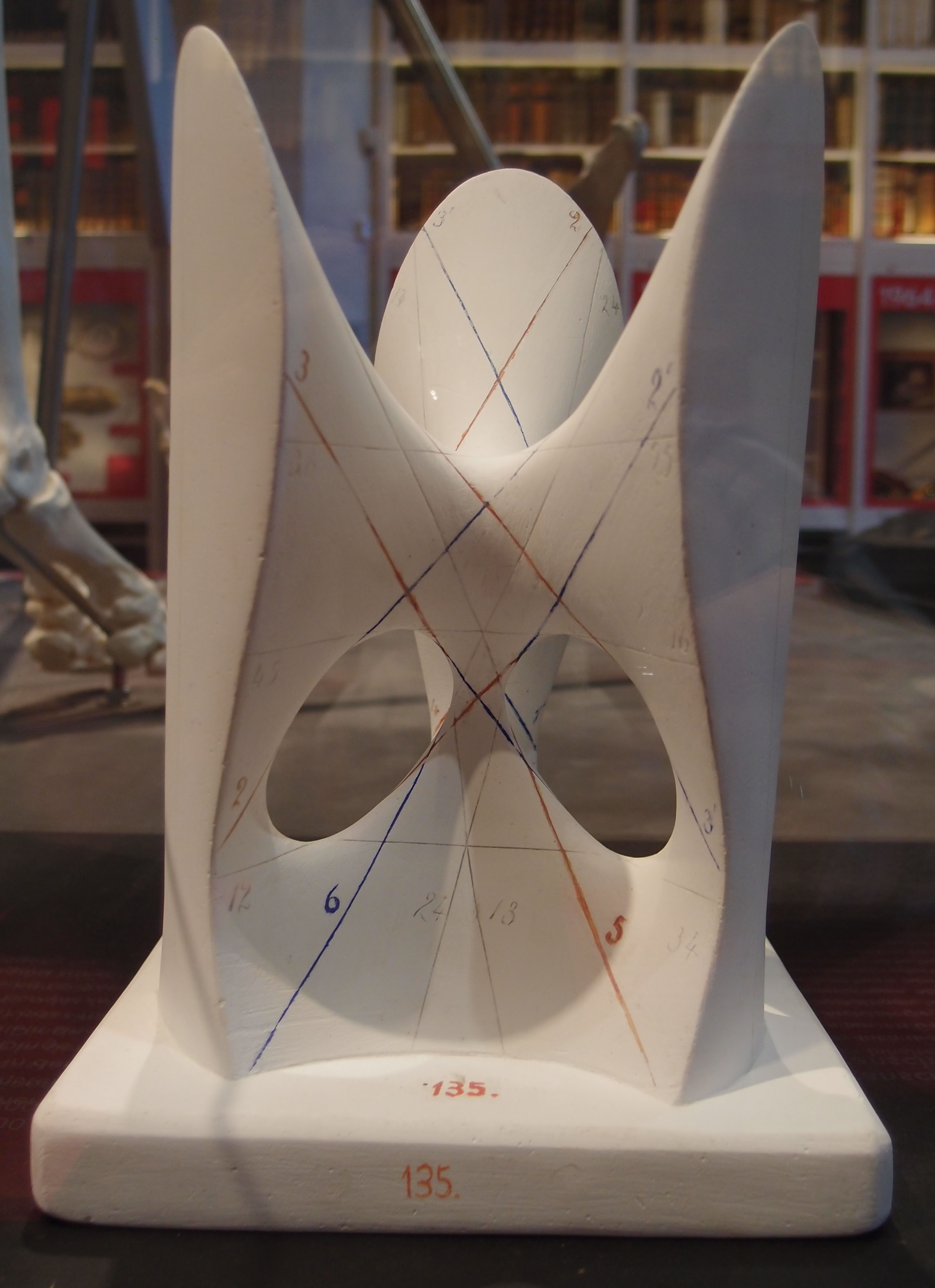
Model of the surface

In mathematics, the Clebsch diagonal cubic surface, or Klein's icosahedral cubic surface, is a non-singular cubic surface, studied by Clebsch (1871) and Klein (1873), all of whose 27 exceptional lines can be defined over the real numbers. The term Klein's icosahedral surface can refer to either this surface or its blowup at the 10 Eckardt points.

== Definition ==
The Clebsch surface is the set of points (x_{0}:x_{1}:x_{2}:x_{3}:x_{4}) of P^{4} satisfying the equations

$$x_0 + x_1 + x_2 + x_3 + x_4 = 0,$$
$$x_0^3 + x_1^3 + x_2^3 + x_3^3 + x_4^3 = 0.$$

Eliminating x_{0} shows that it is also isomorphic to the surface in P^{3} defined by

$$x_1^3 + x_2^3 + x_3^3 + x_4^3 = (x_1 + x_2 + x_3 + x_4)^3.$$

In R^{3}, it can be represented by

$\begin{array}{c} 81\left(x^{3}+y^{3}+z^{3}\right)-189\left(x^{2}\left(y+z\right)+y^{2}\left(z+x\right)+z^{2}\left(x+y\right)\right)+ \\ +54xyz+126\left(xy+yz+zx\right)-9\left(x^{2}+y^{2}+z^{2}\right)-9\left(x+y+z\right)+1=0. \end{array}$	1

== Properties ==
The symmetry group of the Clebsch surface is the symmetric group S_{5} of order 120, acting by permutations of the coordinates (in P^{4}). Up to isomorphism, the Clebsch surface is the only cubic surface with this automorphism group.

The 27 exceptional lines are:

- The 15 images (under S_{5}) of the line of points of the form (a : −a : b : −b : 0).
- The 12 images of the line though the point (1:ζ: ζ^{2}: ζ^{3}: ζ^{4}) and its complex conjugate, where ζ is a primitive 5th root of unity.

The surface has 10 Eckardt points where 3 lines meet, given by the point (1: −1: 0: 0: 0) and its conjugates under permutations. Hirzebruch (1976) showed that the surface obtained by blowing up the Clebsch surface in its 10 Eckardt points is the Hilbert modular surface of the level 2 principal congruence subgroup of the Hilbert modular group of the field Q(√5). The quotient of the Hilbert modular group by its level 2 congruence subgroup is isomorphic to the alternating group of order 60 on 5 points.

Like all nonsingular cubic surfaces, the Clebsch cubic can be obtained by blowing up the projective plane in 6 points. Klein (1873) described these points as follows. If the projective plane is identified with the set of lines through the origin in a 3-dimensional vector space containing an icosahedron centered at the origin, then the 6 points correspond to the 6 lines through the icosahedron's 12 vertices. The Eckardt points correspond to the 10 lines through the centers of the 20 faces.

=== Explicit description of lines ===
Using the embedding (1), the 27 lines are given in parametric form by (a, b, c) t + (p, q, r), where the points (a, b, c) and (p, q, r) are taken from the same row in the following table:

$\left(a,\, b,\, c\right)$	$\left(p,\, q,\, r\right)$
$\left(1 ,\, -1 ,\, 0\right)$	$\left(0 ,\, 0 ,\, -\frac{1}{3}\right)$
$\left(1 ,\, 0 ,\, -1\right)$	$\left(0 ,\, -\frac{1}{3} ,\, 0\right)$
$\left(0 ,\, 1 ,\, -1\right)$	$\left(-\frac{1}{3} ,\, 0 ,\, 0\right)$
$\left(1 ,\, -1 ,\, 0\right)$	$\left(\frac{1}{6} ,\, \frac{1}{6} ,\, 0\right)$
$\left(1 ,\, -1 ,\, 0\right)$	$\left(\frac{1}{3} ,\, \frac{1}{3} ,\, \frac{1}{3}\right)$
$\left(1 ,\, 0 ,\, -1\right)$	$\left(\frac{1}{6} ,\, 0 ,\, \frac{1}{6}\right)$
$\left(1 ,\, 0 ,\, -1\right)$	$\left(\frac{1}{3} ,\, \frac{1}{3} ,\, \frac{1}{3}\right)$
$\left(0 ,\, 1 ,\, -1\right)$	$\left(0 ,\, \frac{1}{6} ,\, \frac{1}{6}\right)$
$\left(0 ,\, 1 ,\, -1\right)$	$\left(\frac{1}{3} ,\, \frac{1}{3} ,\, \frac{1}{3}\right)$
$\left(3 ,\, 0 ,\, 1\right)$	$\left(\frac{1}{6} ,\, 0 ,\, \frac{1}{6}\right)$
$\left(3 ,\, 1 ,\, 0\right)$	$\left(\frac{1}{6} ,\, \frac{1}{6} ,\, 0\right)$
$\left(0 ,\, 3 ,\, 1\right)$	$\left(0 ,\, \frac{1}{6} ,\, \frac{1}{6}\right)$
$\left(1 ,\, 3 ,\, 0\right)$	$\left(\frac{1}{6} ,\, \frac{1}{6} ,\, 0\right)$
$\left(0 ,\, 1 ,\, 3\right)$	$\left(0 ,\, \frac{1}{6} ,\, \frac{1}{6}\right)$
$\left(1 ,\, 0 ,\, 3\right)$	$\left(\frac{1}{6} ,\, 0 ,\, \frac{1}{6}\right)$
$\left(1+\frac{3}{\sqrt{5}} ,\, -\frac{1}{\sqrt{5}} ,\, 1\right)$	$\left(\frac{5+\sqrt{5}}{30} ,\, \frac{5+3\sqrt{5}}{30} ,\, 0\right)$
$\left(-\frac{1}{\sqrt{5}} ,\, 1+\frac{3}{\sqrt{5}} ,\, 1\right)$	$\left(\frac{5+3\sqrt{5}}{30} ,\, \frac{5+\sqrt{5}}{30} ,\, 0\right)$
$\left(-3-\sqrt{5} ,\, -\sqrt{5} ,\, 1\right)$	$\left(\frac{7+3\sqrt{5}}{6} ,\, \frac{3+\sqrt{5}}{6} ,\, 0\right)$
$\left(\frac{-3+\sqrt{5}}{4} ,\, \frac{-5+3\sqrt{5}}{4} ,\, 1\right)$	$\left(\frac{3+\sqrt{5}}{12} ,\, \frac{1-\sqrt{5}}{12} ,\, 0\right)$
$\left(\frac{-5-3\sqrt{5}}{4} ,\, \frac{-3-\sqrt{5}}{4} ,\, 1\right)$	$\left(\frac{1+\sqrt{5}}{12} ,\, \frac{3-\sqrt{5}}{12} ,\, 0\right)$
$\left(\sqrt{5} ,\, -3+\sqrt{5} ,\, 1\right)$	$\left(\frac{3-\sqrt{5}}{6} ,\, \frac{7-3\sqrt{5}}{6} ,\, 0\right)$
$\left(-\sqrt{5} ,\, -3-\sqrt{5} ,\, 1\right)$	$\left(\frac{3+\sqrt{5}}{6} ,\, \frac{7+3\sqrt{5}}{6} ,\, 0\right)$
$\left(\frac{-5+3\sqrt{5}}{4} ,\, \frac{-3+\sqrt{5}}{4} ,\, 1\right)$	$\left(\frac{1-\sqrt{5}}{12} ,\, \frac{3+\sqrt{5}}{12} ,\, 0\right)$
$\left(\frac{-3-\sqrt{5}}{4} ,\, \frac{-5-3\sqrt{5}}{4} ,\, 1\right)$	$\left(\frac{3-\sqrt{5}}{12} ,\, \frac{1+\sqrt{5}}{12} ,\, 0\right)$
$\left(-3+\sqrt{5} ,\, \sqrt{5} ,\, 1\right)$	$\left(\frac{7-3\sqrt{5}}{6} ,\, \frac{3-\sqrt{5}}{6} ,\, 0\right)$
$\left(\frac{1}{\sqrt{5}} ,\, 1-\frac{3}{\sqrt{5}} ,\, 1\right)$	$\left(\frac{5-3\sqrt{5}}{30} ,\, \frac{5-\sqrt{5}}{30} ,\, 0\right)$
$\left(1-\frac{3}{\sqrt{5}} ,\, \frac{1}{\sqrt{5}} ,\, 1\right)$	$\left(\frac{5-\sqrt{5}}{30} ,\, \frac{5-3\sqrt{5}}{30} ,\, 0\right)$
