= Mousetrap (disambiguation) =

A mousetrap is a device for catching mice.

Mousetrap or mouse trap may also refer to:

- The Mousetrap, a play by Agatha Christie
- The Mouse Trap (film), a 2024 movie based on Steamboat Willie.
- Mousetrap, a 2026 South Korean television series.
- Mousetrap (weapon), a 1942 antisubmarine weapon
- Mousetrap (clothing), a device used to prevent a person from taking off their clothing
- Mouse Trap (board game), a 1963 three-dimensional game
- Mouse Trap (1981 video game), an arcade game
- Mouse Trap (1986 video game)
- Mousetrap (Denver), an informal name for the highway interchange of I-25 and I-70 in Denver, Colorado
- Mousetrapping, a technique used by some websites to prevent visitors from leaving their site
- Cayley's mousetrap, a game invented by Arthur Cayley
- The Murder of Gonzago, the play within the play Hamlet, which the prince names as Mousetrap
- The Mouse-Trap, a play by William Dean Howells
- "Mouse Trap", a song by Buckner & Garcia from their album Pac-Man Fever
- "The Mousetrap (Caught In)", a song by Peter Hammill from his album The Future Now
- Mousetrap, a professional wrestling pin popularized by Orange Cassidy

== See also ==
- mau5trap, (pronounced "mousetrap") a Canadian record label
