= Cubic surface =

Algebraic surface defined by a cubic polynomial

In mathematics, a cubic surface is a surface in 3-dimensional space defined by one polynomial equation of degree 3. Cubic surfaces are fundamental examples in algebraic geometry. The theory is simplified by working in projective space rather than affine space, and so cubic surfaces are generally considered in projective 3-space $\mathbf{P}^3$. The theory also becomes more uniform by focusing on surfaces over the complex numbers rather than the real numbers; note that a complex surface has real dimension 4. A simple example is the Fermat cubic surface

$$x^3+y^3+z^3+w^3=0$$

in $\mathbf{P}^3$. Many properties of cubic surfaces hold more generally for del Pezzo surfaces.

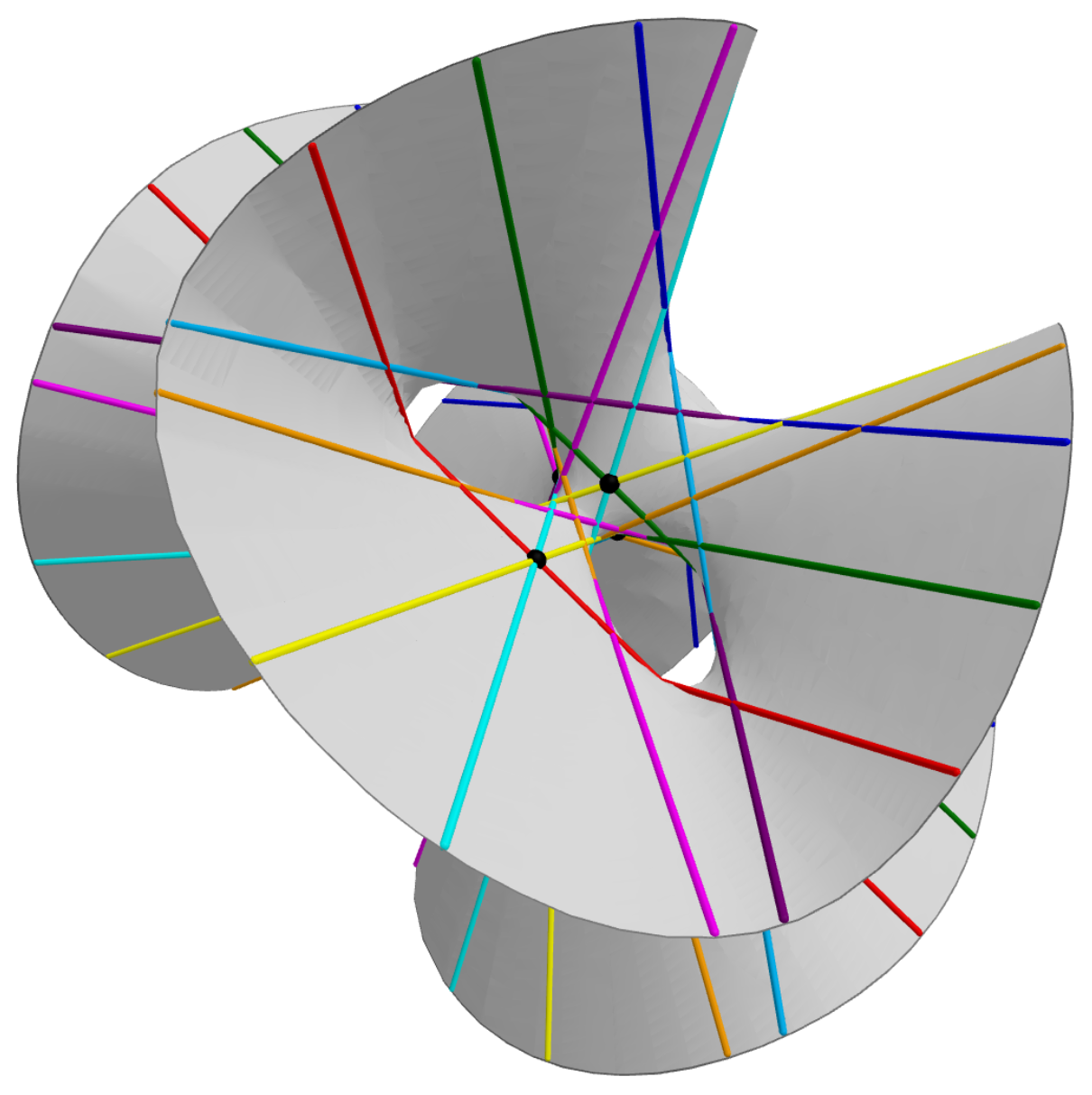
A smooth cubic surface, with its 27 lines

== Rationality of cubic surfaces ==
A central feature of smooth cubic surfaces X over an algebraically closed field is that they are all rational, as shown by Alfred Clebsch in 1866. That is, there is a one-to-one correspondence defined by rational functions between the projective plane $\mathbf{P}^2$ minus a lower-dimensional subset and X minus a lower-dimensional subset. More generally, every irreducible cubic surface (possibly singular) over an algebraically closed field is rational unless it is the projective cone over a cubic curve. In this respect, cubic surfaces are much simpler than smooth surfaces of degree at least 4 in $\mathbf{P}^3$, which are never rational. In characteristic zero, smooth surfaces of degree at least 4 in $\mathbf{P}^3$ are not even uniruled.

More strongly, Clebsch showed that every smooth cubic surface in $\mathbf{P}^3$ over an algebraically closed field is isomorphic to the blow-up of $\mathbf{P}^2$ at 6 points. As a result, every smooth cubic surface over the complex numbers is diffeomorphic to the connected sum $\mathbf{CP}^2\# 6(-\mathbf{CP}^2)$, where the minus sign refers to a change of orientation. Conversely, the blow-up of $\mathbf{P}^2$ at 6 points is isomorphic to a cubic surface if and only if the points are in general position, meaning that no three points lie on a line and all 6 do not lie on a conic. As a complex manifold (or an algebraic variety), the surface depends on the arrangement of those 6 points.

== 27 lines on a cubic surface ==
Most proofs of rationality for cubic surfaces start by finding a line on the surface. (In the context of projective geometry, a line in $\mathbf{P}^3$ is isomorphic to $\mathbf{P}^1$.) More precisely, Arthur Cayley and George Salmon showed in 1849 that every smooth cubic surface over an algebraically closed field contains exactly 27 lines. This is a distinctive feature of cubics: a smooth quadric (degree 2) surface is covered by a continuous family of lines, while most surfaces of degree at least 4 in $\mathbf{P}^3$ contain no lines. Another useful technique for finding the 27 lines involves Schubert calculus which computes the number of lines using the intersection theory of the Grassmannian of lines on $\mathbf{P}^3$.

Animation of the 27 lines on a cubic surface

As the coefficients of a smooth complex cubic surface are varied, the 27 lines move continuously. As a result, a closed loop in the family of smooth cubic surfaces determines a permutation of the 27 lines. The group of permutations of the 27 lines arising this way is called the monodromy group of the family of cubic surfaces. A remarkable 19th-century discovery was that the monodromy group is neither trivial nor the whole symmetric group $S_{27}$; it is a group of order 51840, acting transitively on the set of lines. This group was gradually recognized (by Élie Cartan (1896), Arthur Coble (1915–17), and Patrick du Val (1936)) as the Weyl group of type $E_6$, a group generated by reflections on a 6-dimensional real vector space, related to the Lie group $E_6$ of dimension 78.

The same group of order 51840 can be described in combinatorial terms, as the automorphism group of the graph of the 27 lines, with a vertex for each line and an edge whenever two lines meet. This graph was analyzed in the 19th century using subgraphs such as the Schläfli double six configuration. The complementary graph (with an edge whenever two lines are disjoint) is known as the Schläfli graph.

The Schläfli graph

Many problems about cubic surfaces can be solved using the combinatorics of the $E_6$ root system. For example, the 27 lines can be identified with the weights of the fundamental representation of the Lie group $E_6$. The possible sets of singularities that can occur on a cubic surface can be described in terms of subsystems of the $E_6$ root system. One explanation for this connection is that the $E_6$ lattice arises as the orthogonal complement to the anticanonical class $-K_X$ in the Picard group $\operatorname{Pic}(X)\cong \mathbf{Z}^7$, with its intersection form (coming from the intersection theory of curves on a surface). For a smooth complex cubic surface, the Picard lattice can also be identified with the cohomology group $H^2(X,\mathbf{Z})$.

An Eckardt point is a point where 3 of the 27 lines meet. Most cubic surfaces have no Eckardt point, but such points occur on a codimension-1 subset of the family of all smooth cubic surfaces.

Given an identification between a cubic surface on X and the blow-up of $\mathbf{P}^2$ at 6 points in general position, the 27 lines on X can be viewed as: the 6 exceptional curves created by blowing up, the birational transforms of the 15 lines through pairs of the 6 points in $\mathbf{P}^2$, and the birational transforms of the 6 conics containing all but one of the 6 points. A given cubic surface can be viewed as a blow-up of $\mathbf{P}^2$ in more than one way (in fact, in 72 different ways), and so a description as a blow-up does not reveal the symmetry among all 27 of the lines.

The relation between cubic surfaces and the $E_6$ root system generalizes to a relation between all del Pezzo surfaces and root systems. This is one of many ADE classifications in mathematics. Pursuing these analogies, Vera Serganova and Alexei Skorobogatov gave a direct geometric relation between cubic surfaces and the Lie group $E_6$.

In physics, the 27 lines can be identified with the 27 possible charges of M-theory on a six-dimensional torus (6 momenta; 15 membranes; 6 fivebranes) and the group E_{6} then naturally acts as the U-duality group. This map between del Pezzo surfaces and M-theory on tori is known as mysterious duality.

== Special cubic surfaces ==
The smooth complex cubic surface in $\mathbf{P}^3$ with the largest automorphism group is the Fermat cubic surface, defined by

$$x^3+y^3+z^3+w^3=0.$$

Its automorphism group is an extension $3^3:S_4$, of order 648.

The next most symmetric smooth cubic surface is the Clebsch surface, which can be defined in $\mathbf{P}^4$ by the two equations

$$x_0+x_1+x_2+x_3+x_4=x_0^3+x_1^3+x_2^3+x_3^3+x_4^3=0.$$

Its automorphism group is the symmetric group $S_5$, of order 120. After a complex linear change of coordinates, the Clebsch surface can also be defined by the equation

$$x^2y+y^2z+z^2w+w^2x=0$$

in $\mathbf{P}^3$.

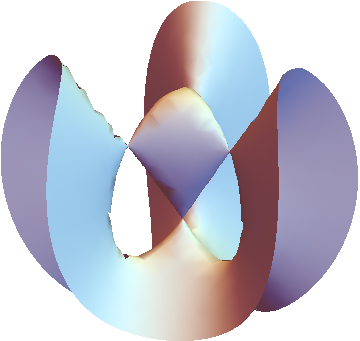
Cayley's nodal cubic surface

Among singular complex cubic surfaces, Cayley's nodal cubic surface is the unique surface with the maximal number of nodes, 4:

$$wxy+xyz+yzw+zwx=0.$$

Its automorphism group is $S_4$, of order 24.

== Real cubic surfaces ==
In contrast to the complex case, the space of smooth cubic surfaces over the real numbers is not connected in the classical topology (based on the topology of R). Its connected components (in other words, the classification of smooth real cubic surfaces up to isotopy) were determined by Ludwig Schläfli (1863), Felix Klein (1865), and H. G. Zeuthen (1875). Namely, there are 5 isotopy classes of smooth real cubic surfaces X in $\mathbf{P}^3$, distinguished by the topology of the space of real points $X(\mathbf{R})$. The space of real points is diffeomorphic to either $W_7, W_5, W_3, W_1$, or the disjoint union of $W_1$ and the 2-sphere, where $W_r$ denotes the connected sum of r copies of the real projective plane $\mathbf{RP}^2$. In these five cases, the number of real lines contained in X is 27, 15, 7, 3, or 3, respectively.

A smooth real cubic surface is rational over R if and only if its space of real points is connected, hence in the first four of the previous five cases.

The average number of real lines on X is $6 \sqrt{2}-3$ when the defining polynomial for X is sampled at random from the Gaussian ensemble induced by the Bombieri inner product.

== Moduli spaces of cubic surfaces ==
Two smooth cubic surfaces are isomorphic as algebraic varieties if and only if they are equivalent by some linear automorphism of $\mathbf{P}^3$. Geometric invariant theory (GIT) gives a moduli space of smooth cubic surfaces, with one point for each isomorphism class of smooth cubic surfaces. This moduli space has dimension 4. More precisely, it is an open subset of the weighted projective space $\mathbb P(1,2,3,4,5)$, by Salmon and Clebsch (1860). In particular, it is a rational 4-fold. This moduli space can be compactified into $\mathbb P(1,2,3,4,5)$ itself using the GIT quotient of all polystable cubic forms in 4 variables. The additional points represent either cubic surfaces with nodes (Du Val singularities of type $A_1$) or the unique cubic surface with three $A_2$ singularities. In particular, this compactification is isomorphic to the K-moduli space of cubic surfaces.

Further compactifications of the moduli have been considered. By giving a marking to a surface $S$, its (-1)-curves receive a labelling, allowing to take the union $B$ of all (-1)-curves and ask when a pair $(S,B)$ is KSBA-stable. Hacking, Keel and Tevelev studied this compactification for cubic surfaces and other del Pezzo surfaces.

A different approach considers pairs $(S,D)$ where $S$ is a cubic surface and $D$ is an anti-canonical divisor. By means of GIT, one can provide 11 non-isomorphic compactifications of these pairs. These compactifications are isomorphic to the K-moduli of these log pairs, analogously to the case of surfaces.

== The cone of curves ==
The lines on a cubic surface X over an algebraically closed field can be described intrinsically, without reference to the embedding of X in $\mathbf{P}^3$: they are exactly the (−1)-curves on X, meaning the curves isomorphic to $\mathbf{P}^1$ that have self-intersection −1. Also, the classes of lines in the Picard lattice of X (or equivalently the divisor class group) are exactly the elements u of Pic(X) such that $u^2=-1$ and $-K_X\cdot u=1$. (This uses that the restriction of the hyperplane line bundle O(1) on $\mathbf{P}^3$ to X is the anticanonical line bundle $-K_X$, by the adjunction formula.)

For any projective variety X, the cone of curves means the convex cone spanned by all curves in X (in the real vector space $N_1(X)$ of 1-cycles modulo numerical equivalence, or in the homology group $H_2(X,\mathbf{R})$ if the base field is the complex numbers). For a cubic surface, the cone of curves is spanned by the 27 lines. In particular, it is a rational polyhedral cone in $N_1(X)\cong \mathbf{R}^7$ with a large symmetry group, the Weyl group of $E_6$. There is a similar description of the cone of curves for any del Pezzo surface.

== Cubic surfaces over a field ==
A smooth cubic surface X over a field k which is not algebraically closed need not be rational over k. As an extreme case, there are smooth cubic surfaces over the rational numbers Q (or the p-adic numbers $\mathbf{Q}_p$) with no rational points, in which case X is certainly not rational. If X(k) is nonempty, then X is at least unirational over k, by Beniamino Segre and János Kollár. For k infinite, unirationality implies that the set of k-rational points is Zariski dense in X.

The absolute Galois group of k permutes the 27 lines of X over the algebraic closure $\overline{k}$ of k (through some subgroup of the Weyl group of $E_6$). If some orbit of this action consists of disjoint lines, then X is the blow-up of a "simpler" del Pezzo surface over k at a closed point. Otherwise, X has Picard number 1. (The Picard group of X is a subgroup of the geometric Picard group $\operatorname{Pic}(X_{\overline{k}})\cong \mathbf{Z}^7$.) In the latter case, Segre showed that X is never rational. More strongly, Yuri Manin proved a birational rigidity statement: two smooth cubic surfaces with Picard number 1 over a perfect field k are birational if and only if they are isomorphic. For example, these results give many cubic surfaces over Q that are unirational but not rational.

== Singular cubic surfaces ==
In contrast to smooth cubic surfaces which contain 27 lines, singular cubic surfaces contain fewer lines. Moreover, they can be classified by the type of singularity which arises in their normal form. These singularities are classified using Dynkin diagrams.

=== Classification ===
A normal singular cubic surface $X$ in $\textbf{P}_{\mathbb{C}}^3$ with local coordinates $[x_0:x_1:x_2:x_3]$ is said to be in normal form if it is given by $F= x_3 f_2(x_0,x_1,x_2) -f_3(x_0,x_1,x_2) = 0$. Depending on the type of singularity $X$ contains, it is isomorphic to the projective surface in $\textbf{P}^3$ given by $F= x_3 f_2(x_0,x_1,x_2) -f_3(x_0,x_1,x_2) = 0$ where $f_2, f_3$ are as in the table below. That means we can obtain a classification of all singular cubic surfaces. The parameters of the following table are as follows: $a,b,c$ are three distinct elements of $\mathbb{C} \setminus\{0,1\}$, the parameters $d,e$ are in $\mathbb{C} \setminus \{0,-1\}$ and $u$ is an element of $\mathbb{C}\setminus \{ 0\}$. Notice that there are two different singular cubic surfaces with singularity $D_4$.

Classification of singular cubic surfaces by singularity type
| Singularity | $f_2(x_0, x_1, x_2)$ | $f_3(x_0, x_1, x_2)$ |
|---|---|---|
| $A_1$ | $x_0x_2-x_1^2$ | $(x_0-ax_1)(-x_0+(b+1)x_1 - bx_2)(x_1-cx_2)$ |
| $2A_1$ | $x_0x_2-x_1^2$ | $(x_0-2x_1+x_2)(x_0-ax_1)(x_1-bx_2)$ |
| $A_1A_2$ | $x_0x_2-x_1^2$ | $(x_0-x_1)(-x_1+x_2)(x_0-(a+1)x_1+ax_2)$ |
| $3A_1$ | $x_0x_2-x_1^2$ | $x_0x_2(x_0-(a+1)x_1+ax_2)$ |
| $A_1A_3$ | $x_0x_2-x_1^2$ | $(x_0-x_1)(-x_1+x_2)(x_0-2x_1+x_2)$ |
| $2A_1A_2$ | $x_0x_2-x_1^2$ | $x_1^2(x_0-x_1)$ |
| $4A_1$ | $x_0x_2-x_1^2$ | $(x_0-x_1)(x_1-x_2)x_1$ |
| $A_1A_4$ | $x_0x_2-x_1^2$ | $x_0^2x_1$ |
| $2A_1A_3$ | $x_0x_2-x_1^2$ | $x_0x_1^2$ |
| $A_12A_2$ | $x_0x_2-x_1^2$ | $x_1^3$ |
| $A_1A_5$ | $x_0x_2-x_1^2$ | $x_0^3$ |
| $A_2$ | $x_0x_1$ | $x_2(x_0+x_1+x_2)(dx_0+ex_1+dex_2)$ |
| $2A_2$ | $x_0x_1$ | $x_2(x_1+x_2)(-x_1+dx_2)$ |
| $3A_2$ | $x_0x_1$ | $x_2^3$ |
| $A_3$ | $x_0x_1$ | $x_2(x_0+x_1+x_2)(x_0-ux_1)$ |
| $A_4$ | $x_0x_1$ | $x_0^2x_2 + x_1^3 - x_1x_2^2$ |
| $A_5$ | $x_0x_1$ | $x_0^3 + x_1^3 - x_1x_2^2$ |
| $D_4(1)$ | $x_0^2$ | $x_1^3+x_2^3$ |
| $D_4(2)$ | $x_0^2$ | $x_1^3+x_2^3+x_0x_1x_2$ |
| $D_5$ | $x_0^2$ | $x_0x_2^2 + x_1^2x_2$ |
| $E_6$ | $x_0^2$ | $x_0x_2^2 + x_1^3$ |
| $\tilde{E}_6$ | $0$ | $x_1^2x_2-x_0(x_0-x_2)(x_0-ax_2)$ |

In normal form, whenever a cubic surface $X$ contains at least one $A_1$ singularity, it will have an $A_1$ singularity at $[0:0:0:1]$.

=== Lines on singular cubic surfaces ===
According to the classification of singular cubic surfaces, the following table shows the number of lines each surface contains.

Lines on singular cubic surfaces
| Singularity | $A_1$ | $2A_1$ | $A_1A_2$ | $3A_1$ | $A_1A_3$ | $2A_1A_2$ | $4A_1$ | $A_1A_4$ | $2A_1A_3$ | $A_12A_2$ | $A_1A_5$ | $A_2$ | $2A_2$ | $3A_2$ | $A_3$ | $A_4$ | $A_5$ | $D_4$ | $D_5$ | $E_6$ | $\tilde{E}_6$ |
| No. of lines | 21 | 16 | 11 | 12 | 7 | 8 | 9 | 4 | 5 | 5 | 2 | 15 | 7 | 3 | 10 | 6 | 3 | 6 | 3 | 1 | $\infty$ |

=== Automorphism groups of singular cubic surfaces with no parameters ===
An automorphism of a normal singular cubic surface $X$ is the restriction of an automorphism of the projective space $\textbf{P}^3$ to $X$. Such automorphisms preserve singular points. Moreover, they do not permute singularities of different types. If the surface contains two singularities of the same type, the automorphism may permute them. The collection of automorphisms on a cubic surface forms a group, the so-called automorphism group. The following table shows all automorphism groups of singular cubic surfaces with no parameters.

Automorphism groups of singular cubic surfaces with no parameters
| Singularity | Automorphism group of $X$ |
|---|---|
| $A_1A_3$ | $\mathbb{Z}/2 \mathbb{Z}$ |
| $2A_1A_2$ | $\mathbb{Z}/2 \mathbb{Z}$ |
| $4A_1$ | $\Sigma_4$, the symmetric group of order $4!$ |
| $A_1A_4$ | $\mathbb{C}^\times = \mathbb{C} \setminus \{ 0 \}$ |
| $2A_1A_3$ | $\mathbb{C}^\times \rtimes \mathbb{Z} / 2 \mathbb{Z}$ |
| $A_12A_2$ | $\mathbb{C}^\times \rtimes \mathbb{Z} / 2 \mathbb{Z}$ |
| $A_1A_5$ | $\mathbb{C} \rtimes \mathbb{C}^\times$ |
| $3A_2$ | $(\mathbb{C})^2 \rtimes \Sigma_3$ |
| $A_4$ | $\mathbb{Z}/4 \mathbb{Z}$ |
| $A_5$ | $(\mathbb{C} \rtimes \mathbb{Z} /3 \mathbb{Z} ) \rtimes \mathbb{Z} / 2 \mathbb{Z}$ |
| $D_4(1)$ | $\mathbb{C}^\times \rtimes \Sigma_3$ |
| $D_4(2)$ | $\Sigma_3$ |
| $D_5$ | $\mathbb{C}^\times$ |
| $E_6$ | $\mathbb{C} \rtimes \mathbb{C}^\times$ |

== See also ==
- Algebraic surface
- Enriques–Kodaira classification
- Fano variety
- Schubert calculus
