= Grassmann–Cayley algebra =

In mathematics, a Grassmann–Cayley algebra is the exterior algebra with an additional product, which may be called the shuffle product or the regressive product. It is the most general structure in which projective properties are expressed in a coordinate-free way. The technique is based on work by German mathematician Hermann Grassmann on exterior algebra, and subsequently by British mathematician Arthur Cayley's work on matrices and linear algebra. It is a form of modeling algebra for use in projective geometry.

The technique uses subspaces as basic elements of computation, a formalism which allows the translation of synthetic geometric statements into invariant algebraic statements. This can create a useful framework for the modeling of conics and quadrics among other forms, and in tensor mathematics. It also has a number of applications in robotics, particularly for the kinematical analysis of manipulators.
