= Cayley's nodal cubic surface =

Cubic Nodal Surface

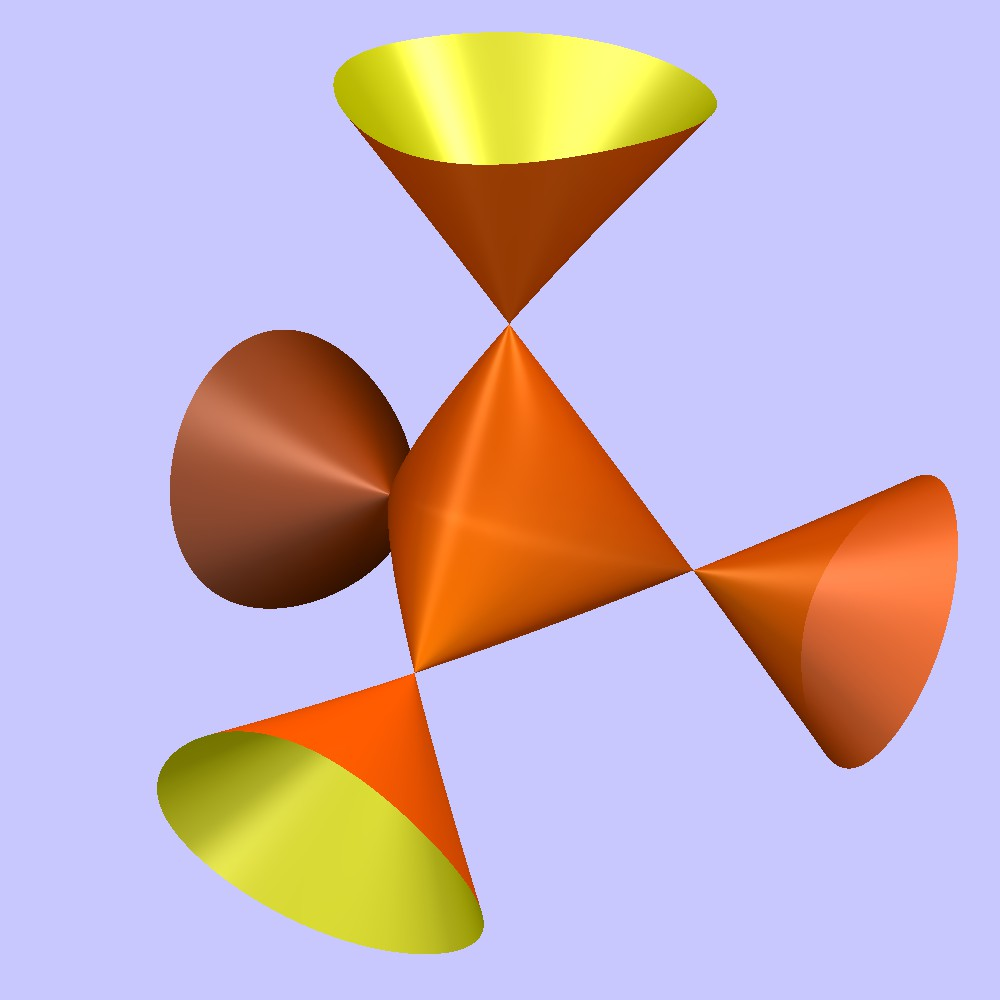
Real points of the Cayley surface

3D model of Cayley surface

In algebraic geometry, the Cayley surface, named after Arthur Cayley, is a cubic nodal surface in 3-dimensional projective space with four conical points. It can be given by the equation

$$wxy+ xyz+ yzw+zwx =0\$$

when the four singular points are those with three vanishing coordinates. Changing variables gives several other simple equations defining the Cayley surface.

As a del Pezzo surface of degree 3, the Cayley surface is given by the linear system of cubics in the projective plane passing through the 6 vertices of the complete quadrilateral. This contracts the 4 sides of the complete quadrilateral to the 4 nodes of the Cayley surface, while blowing up its 6 vertices to the lines through two of them. The surface is a section through the Segre cubic.

The surface contains nine lines, 11 tritangents and no double-sixes.

A number of affine forms of the surface have been presented. Hunt uses $(1-3 x-3y-3z)(xy+xz+yz)+6xyz = 0$ by transforming coordinates $(u_0, u_1, u_2, u_3)$ to $(u_0, u_1, u_2, v=3(u_0+u_1+u_2+ 2 u_3))$ and dehomogenizing by setting $x=u_0/v, y=u_1/v, z=u_2/v$. A more symmetrical form is

$x^2 + y^2 + z^2 + x^2 z - y^2 z - 1 = 0.$
