= Chasles–Cayley–Brill formula =

On the number of united points of a correspondence from an algebraic curve to itself

In algebraic geometry, the Chasles–Cayley–Brill formula, also known as the Cayley–Brill formula, states that a correspondence T of valence k from an algebraic curve C of genus g to itself has d + e + 2kg united points, where d and e are the degrees of T and its inverse.

Michel Chasles introduced the formula for genus g = 0, Arthur Cayley stated the general formula without proof, and Alexander von Brill gave the first proof.

The number of united points of the correspondence is the intersection number of the correspondence with the diagonal Δ of C×C. The correspondence has valence k if and only if it is homologous to a linear combination a(C×1) + b(1×C) – kΔ where Δ is the diagonal of C×C. The Chasles–Cayley–Brill formula follows easily from this together with the fact that the self-intersection number of the diagonal is 2 – 2g.
