= Del Pezzo surface =

Concept in algebraic geometry

In mathematics, a del Pezzo surface or Fano surface is a two-dimensional Fano variety, in other words a non-singular projective algebraic surface with ample anticanonical divisor class. They are in some sense the opposite of surfaces of general type, whose canonical class is big.

They are named for Pasquale del Pezzo who studied the surfaces with the more restrictive condition that they have a very ample anticanonical divisor class, or in his language the surfaces with a degree n embedding in n-dimensional projective space (del Pezzo 1887), which are the del Pezzo surfaces of degree at least 3.

== Classification ==
A del Pezzo surface is a complete non-singular surface with ample anticanonical bundle. There are some variations of this definition that are sometimes used. Sometimes del Pezzo surfaces are allowed to have singularities. They were originally assumed to be embedded in projective space by the anticanonical embedding, which restricts the degree to be at least 3.

The degree d of a del Pezzo surface X is by definition the self intersection number (K, K) of its canonical class K.

Any curve on a del Pezzo surface has self intersection number at least −1. The number of curves with self intersection number −1 is finite and depends only on the degree (unless the degree is 8).

A (−1)-curve is a rational curve with self intersection number −1. For d > 2, the image of such a curve in projective space under the anti-canonical embedding is a line.

The blowdown of any (−1)-curve on a del Pezzo surface is a del Pezzo surface of degree 1 more. The blowup of any point on a del Pezzo surface is a del Pezzo surface of degree 1 less, provided that the point does not lie on a (−1)-curve and the degree is greater than 2. When the degree is 2, we have to add the condition that the point is not fixed by the Geiser involution, associated to the anti-canonical morphism.

Del Pezzo proved that a del Pezzo surface has degree d at most 9. Over an algebraically closed field, every del Pezzo surface is either a product of two projective lines (with d=8), or the blow-up of a projective plane in 9 − d points with no three collinear, no six on a conic, and no eight of them on a cubic having a node at one of them. Conversely any blowup of the plane in points satisfying these conditions is a del Pezzo surface.

The Picard group of a del Pezzo surface of degree d is the odd unimodular lattice I_{1,9−d}, except when the surface is a product of 2 lines when the Picard group is the even unimodular lattice II_{1,1}.When it is an odd lattice, the canonical element is (3, 1, 1, 1, ....), and the exceptional curves are represented by permutations of all but the first coordinate of the following vectors:

- (0, −1, 0, 0, ....) the exceptional curves of the blown up points,
- (1, 1, 1, 0, 0, ...) lines through 2 points,
- (2, 1, 1, 1, 1, 1, 0, ...) conics through 5 points,
- (3, 2, 1, 1, 1, 1, 1, 1, 0, ...) cubics through 7 points with a double point at one of them,
- (4, 2, 2, 2, 1, 1, 1, 1, 1) quartics through 8 points with double points at three of them,
- (5, 2, 2, 2, 2, 2, 2, 1, 1) quintics through 8 points with double points at all but two of them,
- (6, 3, 2, 2, 2, 2, 2, 2, 2) sextics through 8 points with double points at all except a single point with multiplicity three.

== Examples ==
Degree 1: they have 240 (−1)-curves corresponding to the roots of an E_{8} root system. They form an 8-dimensional family. The anticanonical divisor is not very ample. The linear system |−2K| defines a degree 2 map from the del Pezzo surface to a quadratic cone in P^{3}, branched over a nonsingular genus 4 curve cut out by a cubic surface.

Degree 2: they have 56 (−1)-curves corresponding to the minuscule vectors of the dual of the E_{7} lattice. They form a 6-dimensional family. The anticanonical divisor is not very ample, and its linear system defines a map from the del Pezzo surface to the projective plane, branched over a quartic plane curve. This map is generically 2 to 1, so this surface is sometimes called a del Pezzo double plane. The 56 lines of the del Pezzo surface map in pairs to the 28 bitangents of a quartic.

Degree 3: these are essentially cubic surfaces in P^{3}; the cubic surface is the image of the anticanonical embedding. They have 27 (−1)-curves corresponding to the minuscule vectors of one coset in the dual of the E_{6} lattice, which map to the 27 lines of the cubic surface. They form a 4-dimensional family.

Degree 4: these are essentially Segre surfaces in P^{4}, given by the intersection of two quadrics. They have 16 (−1)-curves. They form a 2-dimensional family.

Degree 5: they have 10 (−1)-curves corresponding to the minuscule vectors of one coset in the dual of the A_{4} lattice. There is up to isomorphism only one such surface, given by blowing up the projective plane in 4 points with no 3 on a line.

Degree 6: they have 6 (−1)-curves. There is up to isomorphism only one such surface, given by blowing up the projective plane in 3 points not on a line. The root system is A_{2} × A_{1}

Degree 7: they have 3 (−1)-curves. There is up to isomorphism only one such surface, given by blowing up the projective plane in 2 distinct points.

Degree 8: they have 2 isomorphism types. One is a Hirzebruch surface given by the blow up of the projective plane at one point, which has 1 (−1)-curves. The other is the product of two projective lines, which is the only del Pezzo surface that cannot be obtained by starting with the projective plane and blowing up points. Its Picard group is the even 2-dimensional unimodular indefinite lattice II_{1,1}, and it contains no (−1)-curves.

Degree 9: The only degree 9 del Pezzo surface is P^{2}. Its anticanonical embedding is the degree 3 Veronese embedding into P^{9} using the linear system of cubics.

== Weak del Pezzo surfaces ==
A weak del Pezzo surface is a complete non-singular surface with anticanonical bundle that is nef and big.

The blowdown of any (−1)-curve on a weak del Pezzo surface is a weak del Pezzo surface of degree 1 more. The blowup of any point on a weak del Pezzo surface is a weak del Pezzo surface of degree 1 less, provided that the point does not lie on a −2-curve and the degree is greater than 1.

Any curve on a weak del Pezzo surface has self intersection number at least −2. The number of curves with self intersection number −2 is at most 9−d, and the number of curves with self intersection number −1 is finite.

== See also ==
- The mysterious duality relates geometry of del Pezzo surfaces and M-theory.
- Coble surface
