= Hyperdeterminant =

Concept in algebra

In algebra, the hyperdeterminant is a generalization of the determinant. Whereas a determinant is a scalar valued function defined on an n × n square matrix, a hyperdeterminant is defined on a multidimensional array of numbers or tensor. Like a determinant, the hyperdeterminant is a homogeneous polynomial with integer coefficients in the components of the tensor. Many other properties of determinants generalize in some way to hyperdeterminants, but unlike a determinant, the hyperdeterminant does not have a simple geometric interpretation in terms of volumes.

There are at least three definitions of hyperdeterminant. The first was discovered by Arthur Cayley in 1843 presented to the Cambridge Philosophical Society. It is in two parts and Cayley's first hyperdeterminant is covered in the second part. It is usually denoted by det_{0}. The second Cayley hyperdeterminant originated in 1845 and is often denoted "Det". This definition is a discriminant for a singular point on a scalar valued multilinear map.

Cayley's first hyperdeterminant is defined only for hypercubes having an even number of dimensions (although variations exist in odd dimensions). Cayley's second hyperdeterminant is defined for a restricted range of hypermatrix formats (including the hypercubes of any dimensions). The third hyperdeterminant, most recently defined by Glynn, occurs only for fields of prime characteristic p. It is denoted by det_{p} and acts on all hypercubes over such a field.

Only the first and third hyperdeterminants are "multiplicative," except for the second hyperdeterminant in the case of "boundary" formats. The first and third hyperdeterminants also have closed formulae as polynomials and therefore their degrees are known, whereas the second one does not appear to have a closed formula or degree in all cases that are known.

The notation for determinants can be extended to hyperdeterminants without change or ambiguity. Hence the hyperdeterminant of a hypermatrix A may be written using the vertical bar notation as |A| or as det(A).

A standard modern textbook on Cayley's second hyperdeterminant Det (as well as many other results) is "Discriminants, Resultants and Multidimensional Determinants" by Gel'fand, Kapranov and Zelevinsky. Their notation and terminology is followed in the next section.

== Cayley's second hyperdeterminant Det ==
In the special case of a 2 × 2 × 2 hypermatrix the hyperdeterminant is known as Cayley's hyperdeterminant after the British mathematician Arthur Cayley who discovered it. The quartic expression for the Cayley's hyperdeterminant of hypermatrix A with components a_{ijk}, i, j, k ∊ {0, 1} is given by

Det(A) = a_{000}^{2}a_{111}^{2} + a_{001}^{2}a_{110}^{2} + a_{010}^{2}a_{101}^{2} + a_{100}^{2}a_{011}^{2}

− 2a_{000}a_{001}a_{110}a_{111} − 2a_{000}a_{010}a_{101}a_{111} − 2a_{000}a_{011}a_{100}a_{111} − 2a_{001}a_{010}a_{101}a_{110} − 2a_{001}a_{011}a_{110}a_{100} − 2a_{010}a_{011}a_{101}a_{100}+ 4a_{000}a_{011}a_{101}a_{110} + 4a_{001}a_{010}a_{100}a_{111}.

This expression acts as a discriminant in the sense that it is zero if and only if there is a non-zero solution in six unknowns x^{i}, y^{i}, z^{i}, (with superscript i = 0 or 1) of the following system of equations

a_{000}x^{0}y^{0} + a_{010}x^{0}y^{1} + a_{100}x^{1}y^{0} + a_{110}x^{1}y^{1} = 0

a_{001}x^{0}y^{0} + a_{011}x^{0}y^{1} + a_{101}x^{1}y^{0} + a_{111}x^{1}y^{1} = 0

a_{000}x^{0}z^{0} + a_{001}x^{0}z^{1} + a_{100}x^{1}z^{0} + a_{101}x^{1}z^{1} = 0

a_{010}x^{0}z^{0} + a_{011}x^{0}z^{1} + a_{110}x^{1}z^{0} + a_{111}x^{1}z^{1} = 0

a_{000}y^{0}z^{0} + a_{001}y^{0}z^{1} + a_{010}y^{1}z^{0} + a_{011}y^{1}z^{1} = 0

a_{100}y^{0}z^{0} + a_{101}y^{0}z^{1} + a_{110}y^{1}z^{0} + a_{111}y^{1}z^{1} = 0.

The hyperdeterminant can be written in a more compact form using the Einstein convention for summing over indices and the Levi-Civita symbol which is an alternating tensor density with components ε^{ij} specified by ε^{00} = ε^{11} = 0, ε^{01} = −ε^{10} = 1:

b_{kn} = (1/2)ε^{il}ε^{jm}a_{ijk}a_{lmn}

Det(A) = (1/2)ε^{il}ε^{jm}b_{ij}b_{lm}.

Using the same conventions we can define a multilinear form

f(x,y,z) = a_{ijk} x^{i}y^{j}z^{k}

Then the hyperdeterminant is zero if and only if there is a non-trivial point where all partial derivatives of f vanish.

=== As a tensor expression ===
The above determinant can be written in terms of a generalisation of the Levi-Civita symbol:

$$\mathrm{Det}(A) = f^{ijkl}f^{nmop}f^{qrst}a_{inq}a_{jmr}a_{kos}a_{lpt}$$

where f is a generalisation of the Levi-Civita symbol which allows two indices to be the same:

$$f^{0011}=f^{1100}=f^{0110}=f^{1001} = -1/2$$

$$f^{0101}=f^{1010}=1$$

where the f satisfy:

$$f^{...abc...} + f^{...bca...}+f^{...cab...}+f^{...cba...} + f^{...acb...}+f^{...bac...} = 0.$$

=== As a discriminant ===
For symmetric 2 × 2 × 2 × ⋯ hypermatrices, the hyperdeterminant is the discriminant of a polynomial. For example,

$$a_{000}=a$$
$$a_{001}=a_{010}=a_{100} = b$$
$$a_{110}=a_{101}=a_{011} = c$$
$$a_{111}=d$$

Then Det(A) is the discriminant of $ax^3 + 3bx^2 + 3cx + d.$

== Other general hyperdeterminants related to Cayley's Det ==
=== Definitions ===
In the general case a hyperdeterminant is defined as a discriminant for a multilinear map f from finite-dimensional vector spaces V_{i} to their underlying field K which may be $\mathbb{R}$ or $\mathbb{C}$.

$$f: V_1 \otimes V_2 \otimes \cdots \otimes V_r \to K$$

f can be identified with a tensor in the tensor product of each dual space V^{*}_{i}

$$f \in V^*_1 \otimes V^*_2 \otimes \cdots \otimes V^*_r$$

By definition a hyperdeterminant Det(f) is a polynomial in components of the tensor f which is zero if and only if the map f has a non-trivial point where all partial derivatives with respect to the components of its vector arguments vanish (a non-trivial point means that none of the vector arguments are zero.)

The vector spaces V_{i} need not have the same dimensions and the hyperdeterminant is said to be of format (k_{1}, ..., k_{r}) k_{i} > 0, if the dimension of each space V_{i} is k_{i} + 1. It can be shown that the hyperdeterminant exists for a given format and is unique up to a scalar factor, if and only if the largest number in the format is less than or equal to the sum of the other numbers in the format.

This definition does not provide a means to construct the hyperdeteriminant and in general this is a difficult task. For hyperdeterminants with formats where r ≥ 4 the number of terms is usually too large to write out the hyperdeterminant in full. For larger r even the degree of the polynomial increases rapidly and does not have a convenient general formula.

=== Examples ===
The case of formats with r = 1 deals with vectors of length k_{1} + 1. In this case the sum of the other format numbers is zero and k_{1} is always greater than zero so no hyperdeterminants exist.

The case of r = 2 deals with (k_{1} + 1) × (k_{2} + 1) matrices. Each format number must be greater than or equal to the other, therefore only square matrices S have hyperdeterminants and they can be identified with the determinant det(S). Applying the definition of the hyperdeterminant as a discriminant to this case requires that det(S) is zero when there are vectors X and Y such that the matrix equations SX = 0 and YS = 0 have solutions for non-zero X and Y.

For r > 2 there are hyperdeterminants with different formats satisfying the format inequality. For example, Cayley's 2 × 2 × 2 hyperdeterminant has format (1, 1, 1) and a 2 × 2 × 3 hyperdeterminant of format (1, 1, 2) also exists. However a 2 × 2 × 4 hyperdeterminant would have format (1, 1, 3) but 3 > 1 + 1 so it does not exist.

=== Degree ===
Since the hyperdeterminant is homogeneous in its variables it has a well-defined degree that is a function of the format and is written N(k_{1}, ..., k_{r}). In special cases we can write down an expression for the degree. For example, a hyperdeterminant is said to be of boundary format when the largest format number is the sum of the others and in this case we have

$$N(k_2 + \cdots + k_r, k_2, \ldots, k_r) = \frac{(k_2 + \cdots + k_r + 1)!}{k_2! \cdots k_r!}.$$

For hyperdeterminants of dimensions 2^{r}, a convenient generating formula for the degrees N_{r} is

$$\sum_{r=0}^\infty N_r \frac{z^r}{r!} = \frac{e^{-2z}}{(1-z)^2}.$$

In particular for r = 2,3,4,5,6 the degree is respectively 2, 4, 24, 128, 880 and then grows very rapidly.

Three other special formulae for computing the degree of hyperdeterminants are given in

for 2 × m × m use N(1, m − 1, m − 1) = 2m(m − 1)

for 3 × m × m use N(2, m − 1, m − 1) = 3m(m − 1)^{2}

for 4 × m × m use N(3, m − 1, m − 1) = (2/3)m(m − 1)(m − 2)(5m − 3)

A general result that follows from the hyperdeterminants product rule and invariance properties listed below is that the least common multiple of the dimensions of the vector spaces on which the linear map acts divides the degree of the hyperdeterminant, that is,

lcm(k_{1} + 1, ..., k_{r} + 1) | N(k_{1}, ..., k_{r}).

== Properties of hyperdeterminants ==
Hyperdeterminants generalise many of the properties of determinants. The property of being a discriminant is one of them and it is used in the definition above.

=== Multiplicative properties ===
One of the most familiar properties of determinants is the multiplication rule which is sometimes known as the Binet-Cauchy formula. For square n × n matrices A and B the rule says that

det(AB) = det(A)det(B)

This is one of the harder rules to generalize from determinants to hyperdeterminants because generalizations of products of hypermatrices can give hypermatrices of different sizes. The full domain of cases in which the product rule can be generalized is still a subject of research. However, there are some basic instances that can be stated.

Given a multilinear form f(x_{1}, ..., x_{r}) we can apply a linear transformation on the last argument using an n × n matrix B, y_{r} = B x_{r}. This generates a new multilinear form of the same format,

g(x_{1}, ..., x_{r}) = f(x_{1}, ..., y_{r})

In terms of hypermatrices this defines a product which can be written g = f.B

It is then possible to use the definition of the hyperdeterminant to show that

det(f.B) = det(f)det(B)^{N/n}

where n is the degree of the hyperdeterminant. This generalises the product rule for matrices.

Further generalizations of the product rule have been demonstrated for appropriate products of hypermatrices of boundary format.

Cayley's first hyperdeterminant det_{0} is multiplicative in the following sense. Let A be a r-dimensional n × ... × n hypermatrix with elements a_{i, ..., k}, B be a s-dimensional n × ... × n hypermatrix with elements b_{...}, and C be a (r + s − 2)-dimensional n × ... × n hypermatrix with elements c_{...} such that (using Einstein notation)

c_{i, ..., j, l, ..., m} = a_{i, ..., j}^{k}b_{k, l, ..., m},

then

det_{0}(C) = det_{0}(A) det_{0}(B).

=== Invariance properties ===
A determinant is not usually considered in terms of its properties as an algebraic invariant but when determinants are generalized to hyperdeterminants the invariance is more notable. Using the multiplication rule above on the hyperdeterminant of a hypermatrix H times a matrix S with determinant equal to one gives

det(H.S) = det(H)

In other words, the hyperdeterminant is an algebraic invariant under the action of the special linear group SL(n) on the hypermatrix. The transformation can be equally well applied to any of the vector spaces on which the multilinear map acts to give another distinct invariance. This leads to the general result,

The hyperdeterminant of format $(k_1,\ldots,k_r)$ is an invariant under an action of the group $\mathrm{SL}(k_1+1) \otimes \cdots \otimes \mathrm{SL}(k_r+1)$

For example, the determinant of an n × n matrix is an SL(n)^{2} invariant and Cayley's hyperdeterminant for a 2 × 2 × 2 hypermatrix is an SL(2)^{3} invariant.

A more familiar property of a determinant is that if you add a multiple of a row (or column) to a different row (or column) of a square matrix then its determinant is unchanged. This is a special case of its invariance in the case where the special linear transformation matrix is an identity matrix plus a matrix with only one non-zero off-diagonal element. This property generalizes immediately to hyperdeterminants implying invariance when you add a multiple of one slice of a hypermatrix to another parallel slice.

A hyperdeterminant is not the only polynomial algebraic invariant for the group acting on the hypermatrix. For example, other algebraic invariants can be formed by adding and multiplying hyperdeterminants. In general the invariants form a ring algebra and it follows from Hilbert's basis theorem that the ring is finitely generated. In other words, for a given hypermatrix format, all the polynomial algebraic invariants with integer coefficients can be formed using addition, subtraction and multiplication starting from a finite number of them. In the case of a 2 × 2 × 2 hypermatrix, all such invariants can be generated in this way from Cayley's second hyperdeterminant alone, but this is not a typical result for other formats. For example, the second hyperdeterminant for a hypermatrix of format 2 × 2 × 2 × 2 is an algebraic invariant of degree 24 yet all the invariants can be generated from a set of four simpler invariants of degree 6 and less.

== History and applications ==
The second hyperdeterminant was invented and named by Arthur Cayley in 1845, who was able to write down the expression for the 2 × 2 × 2 format, but Cayley went on to use the term for any algebraic invariant and later abandoned the concept in favour of a general theory of polynomial forms which he called "quantics". For the next 140 years there were few developments in the subject and hyperdeterminants were largely forgotten until they were rediscovered by Gel'fand, Kapranov and Zelevinsky in the 1980s as an offshoot of their work on generalized hypergeometric functions. This led to them writing their textbook in which the hyperdeterminant is reintroduced as a discriminant. Indeed, Cayley's first hyperdeterminant is more fundamental than his second, since it is a straightforward generalization the ordinary determinant, and has found recent applications in the Alon-Tarsi conjecture.

Since then the hyperdeterminant has found applications over a wide range of disciplines including algebraic geometry, number theory, quantum computing and string theory.

In algebraic geometry the second hyperdeterminant is studied as a special case of an X-discriminant. A principal result is that there is a correspondence between the vertices of the Newton polytope for hyperdeterminants and the "triangulation" of a cube into simplices.

In quantum computing the invariants on hypermatrices of format 2^{N} are used to study the entanglement of N qubits.

In string theory the hyperdeterminant first surfaced in connection with string dualities and black hole entropy.

== Sources ==
- Cayley, A. (1849). "On the theory of determinants". Trans. Camb. Philos. Soc. VIII: 1–16.
- Cayley, A. (1845). "On the Theory of Linear Transformations". Cambridge Math. J. 4: 193–209.
- Glynn, David G. (1998). "The modular counterparts of Cayley's hyperdeterminants". Bulletin of the Australian Mathematical Society. 57 (3): 479–492. doi:10.1017/s0004972700031890.
- Gelfand, I. M.; Kapranov, M. M.; Zelevinsky, A. V. (1994). Discriminants, resultants, and multidimensional determinants. Boston: Birkhäuser. ISBN 978-0-8176-3660-9.
- Dionisi, Carla; Ottaviani, Giorgio (2001). "The Binet-Cauchy Theorem for the Hyperdeterminant of boundary format multidimensional Matrices". arXiv:math/0104281.
- Luque, J-G.; Thibon, J-Y. (2 April 2003). "Polynomial invariants of four qubits". Physical Review A. 67 (4) 042303. arXiv:quant-ph/0212069. Bibcode:2003PhRvA..67d2303L. doi:10.1103/PhysRevA.67.042303. S2CID 119446859.
- Crilly, Tony; Crilly, A. J. (2006). Arthur Cayley: mathematician laureate of the Victorian age. Baltimore, Maryland: Johns Hopkins University. ISBN 978-0-8018-8011-7.
- Miyake, A. (2003). "Classification of multipartite entangled states by multidimensional determinants". Physical Review A. 67 012108. arXiv:quant-ph/0206111. Bibcode:2003PhRvA..67a2108M. doi:10.1103/PhysRevA.67.012108. S2CID 119659352.
- Duff, M. (2007). "String triality, black hole entropy and Cayley's hyperdeterminant". Physical Review D. 76 (2) 025017. arXiv:hep-th/0601134. Bibcode:2007PhRvD..76b5017D. doi:10.1103/PhysRevD.76.025017. S2CID 15829599.
- Zappa, Paolo (July 1997). "The Cayley Determinant of the Determinant Tensor and the Alon–Tarsi Conjecture". Advances in Applied Mathematics. 19 (1): 31–44. doi:10.1006/aama.1996.0522.
- Glynn, David G. (January 2010). "The Conjectures of Alon–Tarsi and Rota in Dimension Prime Minus One". SIAM Journal on Discrete Mathematics. 24 (2): 394–399. doi:10.1137/090773751.
