= Cayley's mousetrap =

Game in combinatorics

Mousetrap is the name of a game introduced by the English mathematician Arthur Cayley. In the game, cards numbered $1$ through $n$ ("say thirteen" in Cayley's original article) are shuffled to place them in some random permutation and are arranged in a circle with their faces up. Then, starting with the first card, the player begins counting $1, 2, 3, ...$ and moving to the next card as the count is incremented. If at any point the player's current count matches the number on the card currently being pointed to, that card is removed from the circle and the player starts all over at $1$ on the next card. If the player ever removes all of the cards from the permutation in this manner, then the player wins. If the player reaches the count $n+1$ and cards still remain, then the game is lost.

In order for at least one card to be removed, the initial permutation of the cards must not be a derangement. However, this is not a sufficient condition for winning, because it does not take into account subsequent removals. The number of ways the cards can be arranged such that the entire game is won, for n = 1, 2, ..., are

1, 1, 2, 6, 15, 84, 330, 1812, 9978, 65503, ... (sequence A007709 in the OEIS).

For example with four cards, the probability of winning is 0.25, but this reduces as the number of cards increases, and with thirteen cards it is about 0.0046.
