= Cayley's ruled cubic surface =

Algebraic surface

In differential geometry, Cayley's ruled cubic surface is the ruled cubic surface

$$z=xy-x^3/3 \ .$$

In projective coordinates it is $zw^2 = xyw -x^3/3\$.

It contains a (double) line of self-intersection $x=w=0\$and two pinch points.
